= List of Pokémon video games =

The official logo of Pokémon for its international releases

Pokémon is a series of role-playing video games developed by Game Freak and published by Nintendo and The Pokémon Company. Over the years, a number of spin-off games based on the series have also been developed by multiple companies. While the main series consists of RPGs, spin-off games encompass other genres, such as action role-playing, puzzle, fighting, and digital pet games. Most Pokémon video games have been developed exclusively for Nintendo handheld and home consoles, dating from the Game Boy to the Nintendo Switch 2.

Release timeline
| 1996 | Red and Green |
| 1996 | Blue |
1997
| 1998 | Yellow |
| 1999 | Gold and Silver |
| 2000 | Crystal |
2001
| 2002 | Ruby and Sapphire |
2003
| 2004 | FireRed and LeafGreen |
| 2004 | Emerald |
2005
| 2006 | Diamond and Pearl |
2007
| 2008 | Platinum |
| 2009 | HeartGold and SoulSilver |
| 2010 | Black and White |
2011
| 2012 | Black 2 and White 2 |
| 2013 | X and Y |
| 2014 | Omega Ruby and Alpha Sapphire |
2015
| 2016 | Sun and Moon |
| 2017 | Ultra Sun and Ultra Moon |
| 2018 | Let's Go, Pikachu! and Let's Go, Eevee! |
| 2019 | Sword and Shield |
| 2020 | The Isle of Armor (DLC) |
| 2020 | The Crown Tundra (DLC) |
| 2021 | Brilliant Diamond and Shining Pearl |
| 2022 | Legends: Arceus |
| 2022 | Scarlet and Violet |
| 2023 | The Teal Mask (DLC) |
| 2023 | The Indigo Disk (DLC) |
| 2024 | Mochi Mayhem (DLC) |
| 2025 | Legends: Z-A |
| 2025 | Mega Dimension (DLC) |
2026
| 2027 | Winds and Waves |

== Main series games/remakes ==
| Game | Details |
|---|---|
| Pocket Monsters Red and Green Original release date: JP: February 27, 1996; NA: September 28, 1998; AU: October 23, 1998; EU: October 5, 1999 | Release years by system: 1996 – Game Boy; 2016 – 3DS Virtual Console |
| Pocket Monsters Red and Green Original release date: JP: February 27, 1996; NA: September 28, 1998; AU: October 23, 1998; EU: October 5, 1999 | Notes: The first games in the Pokémon series.; Introduced the first generation of Pokémon.; Pocket Monsters Red and Green were only released in Japan.; Red, Green and Blue combined have sold more copies than any other Game Boy game, barring Tetris.; The international debut of the Pokémon franchise and video game series are titled Red and Blue.; Featured the version-exclusive Pokémon included in the Japan-only Red and Green respectively, and the updates from the Japan-only Blue.; Enhanced remakes of Red and Green, called Pokémon FireRed and LeafGreen, were released in 2004 for Game Boy Advance.; Red and Green were re-released on the Nintendo 3DS Virtual Console in 2016. |
| Pocket Monsters Blue (Pokémon Red and Blue) Original release date: JP: October 15, 1996; (CoroCoro Comic): JP: October 10, 1999; (retail) | Release years by system: 1996 – Game Boy (CoroCoro Comic); 1999 – Game Boy (retail); 2016 – 3DS Virtual Console |
| Pocket Monsters Blue (Pokémon Red and Blue) Original release date: JP: October 15, 1996; (CoroCoro Comic): JP: October 10, 1999; (retail) | Notes: Pocket Monsters Blue was released 8 months after Red and Green and featured updated graphics and dialogue.; Pocket Monsters Blue was released only in Japan.; Was the basis for the international versions, Pokémon Red and Blue, released two years later.; Red, Green and Blue combined have sold more copies than any other Game Boy game, barring Tetris.; Used Game Boy cartridges but were packaged as Game Boy Color games.; Blue was re-released on the Nintendo 3DS Virtual Console in 2016. |
| Pokémon Yellow: Special Pikachu Edition Original release dates: JP: September 12, 1998; AU: September 3, 1999; NA: October 18, 1999; EU: June 16, 2000 | Release years by system: 1998 – Game Boy; 2016 – 3DS Virtual Console |
| Pokémon Yellow: Special Pikachu Edition Original release dates: JP: September 12, 1998; AU: September 3, 1999; NA: October 18, 1999; EU: June 16, 2000 | Notes: Known in Japan as Poketto Monsutā Ierō. (Note: Japanese: ポケットモンスターイエロー; lit. Pocket Monsters Yellow); Was the first game in the series where a Pokémon from the player's party could follow them in the overworld, in this case being Pikachu.; Yellow was re-released on Nintendo 3DS Virtual Console in 2016.; Enhanced remakes of Yellow, called Pokémon: Let's Go, Pikachu! and Let's Go, Eevee!, were released in 2018 for Nintendo Switch. |
| Pokémon Gold and Silver Original release dates: JP: November 21, 1999; AU: October 13, 2000; NA: October 15, 2000; EU: April 6, 2001 | Release years by system: 1999 – Game Boy Color; 2017 – 3DS Virtual Console |
| Pokémon Gold and Silver Original release dates: JP: November 21, 1999; AU: October 13, 2000; NA: October 15, 2000; EU: April 6, 2001 | Notes: Known in Japan as Poketto Monsutā Gōrudo (Note: Japanese: ポケットモンスター ゴールド; lit. Pocket Monsters Gold) and Poketto Monsutā Shirubā. (Note: Japanese: ポケットモンスター シルバー; lit. Pocket Monsters Silver); Introduced the second generation of Pokémon.; Sequels of the first generation and is set three years later.; Enhanced remakes of Gold and Silver, called Pokémon HeartGold and SoulSilver, were released in 2009 for Nintendo DS.; Gold and Silver were re-released on the Nintendo 3DS Virtual Console in 2017.; The first Pokémon games released in South Korea, in 2002.; The first Pokémon games to feature shiny Pokémon.; The first core series games to feature a real-time internal clock.; Introduced breeding. |
| Pokémon Crystal Original release dates: JP: December 14, 2000; NA: July 30, 2001; AU: September 30, 2001; EU: November 2, 2001 | Release years by system: 2000 – Game Boy Color; 2018 – 3DS Virtual Console |
| Pokémon Crystal Original release dates: JP: December 14, 2000; NA: July 30, 2001; AU: September 30, 2001; EU: November 2, 2001 | Notes: Known in Japan as Poketto Monsutā Kurisutaru. (Note: Japanese: ポケットモンスター クリスタル; lit. Pocket Monsters Crystal); Enhanced version of Pokémon Gold and Silver.; First core series games to feature a female playable character.; Crystal was re-released on the Nintendo 3DS Virtual Console in 2018. |
| Pokémon Ruby and Sapphire Original release dates: JP: November 21, 2002; NA: March 19, 2003; AU: April 3, 2003; EU: July 25, 2003 | Release years by system: 2002 – Game Boy Advance |
| Pokémon Ruby and Sapphire Original release dates: JP: November 21, 2002; NA: March 19, 2003; AU: April 3, 2003; EU: July 25, 2003 | Notes: Known in Japan as Poketto Monsutā Rubī (Note: Japanese: ポケットモンスター ルビー; lit. Pocket Monsters Ruby) and Poketto Monsutā Safaia. (Note: Japanese: ポケットモンスター サファイア; lit. Pocket Monsters Sapphire); Introduced the third generation of Pokémon.; Enhanced remakes of Ruby and Sapphire, called Pokémon Omega Ruby and Alpha Sapphire, were released in 2014 for Nintendo 3DS.; Ruby and Sapphire combined have sold more than any other Game Boy Advance game.; First core series games to be published by The Pokémon Company, alongside Nintendo, since the establishment of The Pokémon Company in 1998.; First core series games where it was not possible to obtain every pre-existing Pokémon legitimately.; Introduced double battles. |
| Pokémon FireRed and LeafGreen Original release dates: JP: January 29, 2004; NA: September 9, 2004; AU: September 23, 2004; EU: October 1, 2004 | Release years by system: 2004 – Game Boy Advance; 2026 – Nintendo Switch |
| Pokémon FireRed and LeafGreen Original release dates: JP: January 29, 2004; NA: September 9, 2004; AU: September 23, 2004; EU: October 1, 2004 | Notes: Known in Japan as Poketto Monsutā Faiareddo (Note: Japanese: ポケットモンスター ファイアレッド; lit. Pocket Monsters Firered) and Poketto Monsutā Rīfugurīn. (Note: Japanese: ポケットモンスター リーフグリーン; lit. Pocket Monsters Leafgreen); Enhanced remakes of Pokémon Red and Blue.; FireRed and LeafGreen were re-released on the Nintendo Switch in 2026. |
| Pokémon Emerald Original release dates: JP: September 16, 2004; NA: May 1, 2005; AU: June 9, 2005; EU: October 21, 2005 | Release years by system: 2004 – Game Boy Advance |
| Pokémon Emerald Original release dates: JP: September 16, 2004; NA: May 1, 2005; AU: June 9, 2005; EU: October 21, 2005 | Notes: Known in Japan as Poketto Monsutā Emerarudo. (Note: Japanese: ポケットモンスター エメラルド; lit. Pocket Monsters Emerald); Director's cut version of Pokémon Ruby and Sapphire. |
| Pokémon Diamond and Pearl Original release dates: JP: September 28, 2006; NA: April 22, 2007; AU: June 21, 2007; EU: July 27, 2007 | Release years by system: 2006 – Nintendo DS |
| Pokémon Diamond and Pearl Original release dates: JP: September 28, 2006; NA: April 22, 2007; AU: June 21, 2007; EU: July 27, 2007 | Notes: Known in Japan as Poketto Monsutā Daiamondo (Note: Japanese: ポケットモンスター ダイアモンド; lit. Pocket Monsters Diamond) and Poketto Monsutā Pāru. (Note: Japanese: ポケットモンスター パール; lit. Pocket Monsters Pearl); Introduced the fourth generation of Pokémon.; Remakes of Diamond and Pearl (Brilliant Diamond and Shining Pearl) were released on the Nintendo Switch in 2021. |
| Pokémon Platinum Original release dates: JP: September 13, 2008; NA: March 22, 2009; EU: May 22, 2009; AU: May 14, 2009 | Release years by system: 2008 – Nintendo DS |
| Pokémon Platinum Original release dates: JP: September 13, 2008; NA: March 22, 2009; EU: May 22, 2009; AU: May 14, 2009 | Notes: Known in Japan as Poketto Monsutā Purachina. (Note: Japanese: ポケットモンスタープラチナ; lit. Pocket Monsters Platinum); Director's cut version of Pokémon Diamond and Pearl. |
| Pokémon HeartGold and SoulSilver Original release dates: JP: September 12, 2009; NA: March 14, 2010; AU: March 25, 2010; EU: March 26, 2010 | Release years by system: 2009 – Nintendo DS |
| Pokémon HeartGold and SoulSilver Original release dates: JP: September 12, 2009; NA: March 14, 2010; AU: March 25, 2010; EU: March 26, 2010 | Notes: Known in Japan as Poketto Monsutā Hātogōrudo (Note: Japanese: ポケットモンスター ハートゴールド; lit. Pocket Monsters Heartgold) and Poketto Monsutā Sōrushirubā. (Note: Japanese: ポケットモンスター ソウルシルバー; lit. Pocket Monsters Soulsilver); Enhanced remakes of Pokémon Gold and Silver. |
| Pokémon Black and White Original release dates: JP: September 18, 2010; EU: March 4, 2011; NA: March 6, 2011; AU: March 10, 2011 | Release years by system: 2010 – Nintendo DS |
| Pokémon Black and White Original release dates: JP: September 18, 2010; EU: March 4, 2011; NA: March 6, 2011; AU: March 10, 2011 | Notes: Known in Japan as Poketto Monsutā Burakku (Note: Japanese: ポケットモンスター ブラック; lit. Pocket Monsters Black) and Poketto Monsutā Howaito. (Note: Japanese: ポケットモンスター ホワイト; lit. Pocket Monsters White); Introduced the fifth generation of Pokémon.; The first generation to open up the national Pokédex before completing the main story.; Introduced triple battles and rotation battles. |
| Pokémon Black 2 and White 2 Original release dates: JP: June 23, 2012; NA: October 7, 2012; AU: October 11, 2012; EU: October 12, 2012 | Release years by system: 2012 – Nintendo DS |
| Pokémon Black 2 and White 2 Original release dates: JP: June 23, 2012; NA: October 7, 2012; AU: October 11, 2012; EU: October 12, 2012 | Notes: Known in Japan as Poketto Monsutā Burakku Tsū (Note: Japanese: ポケットモンスターブラック2; lit. Pocket Monsters Black 2) and Poketto Monsutā Howaito Tsū. (Note: Japanese: ポケットモンスターホワイト2; lit. Pocket Monsters White 2); Sequels of Pokémon Black and White using the same world map with added locations and various changes two years later. |
| Pokémon X and Y Original release date: WW: October 12, 2013 | Release years by system: 2013 – Nintendo 3DS |
| Pokémon X and Y Original release date: WW: October 12, 2013 | Notes: Known in Japan as Poketto Monsutā Ekkusu (Note: Japanese: ポケットモンスター エックス; lit. Pocket Monsters X) and Poketto Monsutā Wai. (Note: Japanese: ポケットモンスター ワイ; lit. Pocket Monsters Y); Introduced the sixth generation of Pokémon.; The first Pokémon games to have a worldwide simultaneous release.; First core series games to completely feature polygonal 3D graphics.; The first Pokémon games to allow trainer customization.; Introduced Mega Evolution. |
| Pokémon Omega Ruby and Alpha Sapphire Original release dates: JP: November 21, 2014; NA: November 21, 2014; AU: November 21, 2014; EU: November 28, 2014 | Release years by system: 2014 – Nintendo 3DS |
| Pokémon Omega Ruby and Alpha Sapphire Original release dates: JP: November 21, 2014; NA: November 21, 2014; AU: November 21, 2014; EU: November 28, 2014 | Notes: Known in Japan as Poketto Monsutā Omega Rubī (Note: Japanese: ポケットモンスター オメガルビー; lit. Pocket Monsters Omega Ruby) and Poketto Monsutā Arufa Safaia. (Note: Japanese: ポケットモンスター アルファサファイア; lit. Pocket Monsters Alpha Sapphire); Enhanced remakes of Pokémon Ruby and Sapphire. |
| Pokémon Sun and Moon Original release dates: JP: November 18, 2016; NA: November 18, 2016; AU: November 18, 2016; EU: November 23, 2016 | Release years by system: 2016 – Nintendo 3DS |
| Pokémon Sun and Moon Original release dates: JP: November 18, 2016; NA: November 18, 2016; AU: November 18, 2016; EU: November 23, 2016 | Notes: Known in Japan as Poketto Monsutā San (Note: Japanese: ポケットモンスター サン; lit. Pocket Monsters Sun) and Poketto Monsutā Mūn. (Note: Japanese: ポケットモンスター ムーン; lit. Pocket Monsters Moon); Introduced the seventh generation of Pokémon.; The first Pokémon games to support the Chinese language.; Introduced Z-moves.; Introduced regional forms. |
| Pokémon Ultra Sun and Ultra Moon Original release date: WW: November 17, 2017 | Release years by system: 2017 – Nintendo 3DS |
| Pokémon Ultra Sun and Ultra Moon Original release date: WW: November 17, 2017 | Notes: Known in Japan as Poketto Monsutā Urutora San (Note: Japanese: ポケットモンスター ウルトラサン; lit. Pocket Monsters Ultra Sun) and Poketto Monsutā Urutora Mūn. (Note: Japanese: ポケットモンスター ウルトラムーン; lit. Pocket Monsters Ultra Moon); Director's cut versions of Pokémon Sun and Moon.; First Pokémon games to introduce new Pokémon mid-generation. |
| Pokémon: Let's Go, Pikachu! and Let's Go, Eevee! Original release date: WW: November 16, 2018 | Release years by system: 2018 – Nintendo Switch |
| Pokémon: Let's Go, Pikachu! and Let's Go, Eevee! Original release date: WW: November 16, 2018 | Notes: Enhanced remakes of Pokémon Yellow and has integration with Pokémon Go.; Set in the Kanto region with the original 151 Pokémon, their Mega Evolutions introduced in Pokémon X and Y and Pokémon Omega Ruby and Alpha Sapphire and their Alolan forms introduced in Pokémon Sun and Moon.; Reintroduces the concept of Pokémon accompanying the player in the overworld first seen in Pokémon Yellow, with Eevee or Pikachu sitting on the shoulder of the player character and an additional Pokémon can be chosen to follow.; First in the core series to not feature wild Pokémon battles, instead using the capturing concept from Pokémon Go. |
| Pokémon Sword and Shield Original release date: WW: November 15, 2019 | Release years by system: 2019 – Nintendo Switch |
| Pokémon Sword and Shield Original release date: WW: November 15, 2019 | Notes: Known in Japan as Poketto Monsutā Sōdo (Note: Japanese: ポケットモンスター ソード; lit. Pocket Monsters Sword) & Poketto Monsutā Shīrudo. (Note: Japanese: ポケットモンスター シールド; lit. Pocket Monsters Shield); Introduced the eighth generation of Pokémon.; Introduced Dynamaxing and Gigantamaxing.; Does not include all pre-existing Pokémon.; On January 9, 2020, a pair of DLC expansion packs were announced. The first pack, The Isle of Armor, was released on June 17, 2020, while the second, The Crown Tundra, was released on October 23, 2020. The physical bundle containing both packs with the base game was released on November 6, 2020. |
| Pokémon Brilliant Diamond and Shining Pearl Original release date: WW: November 19, 2021 | Release years by system: 2021 – Nintendo Switch |
| Pokémon Brilliant Diamond and Shining Pearl Original release date: WW: November 19, 2021 | Notes: Developed by ILCA.; Enhanced remakes of Pokémon Diamond and Pearl. |
| Pokémon Legends: Arceus Original release date: WW: January 28, 2022 | Release years by system: 2022 – Nintendo Switch |
| Pokémon Legends: Arceus Original release date: WW: January 28, 2022 | Notes: Prequel to Pokémon Brilliant Diamond and Shining Pearl. |
| Pokémon Scarlet and Violet Original release date: WW: November 18, 2022 | Release years by system: 2022 – Nintendo Switch |
| Pokémon Scarlet and Violet Original release date: WW: November 18, 2022 | Notes: Introduced the ninth generation of Pokémon.; Introduced Terastallization.; On February 27, 2023, The Hidden Treasure of Area Zero, a two-part DLC expansion pack was announced. The first part, The Teal Mask, was released on September 13, 2023, while the second, The Indigo Disk, was released on December 14, 2023. An epilogue, Mochi Mayhem, was released on January 11, 2024. |
| Pokémon Legends: Z-A Original release date: WW: October 16, 2025 | Release years by system: 2025 – Nintendo Switch; 2025 – Nintendo Switch 2 |
| Pokémon Legends: Z-A Original release date: WW: October 16, 2025 | Notes: Sequel to Pokémon X and Y.; First in the core series to not feature turn-based combat, instead using a real-time combat system.; Mega Dimension DLC released on 10 December 2025. |
| Pokémon Winds and Waves Original release date: WW: 2027 | Release years by system: 2027 – Nintendo Switch 2 |
| Pokémon Winds and Waves Original release date: WW: 2027 | Notes: Introduced the tenth generation of Pokémon. |

== Spin-off games ==
=== Pokémon Stadium series ===
| Game | Details |
|---|---|
| Pocket Monsters Stadium Original release date: JP: August 1, 1998. | Release years by system: 1998 – Nintendo 64 |
| Pocket Monsters Stadium Original release date: JP: August 1, 1998. | Notes: Developed by Nintendo EAD.; Only released in Japan. |
| Pokémon Stadium Original release dates: JP: April 30, 1999; NA: February 29, 2000; AU: March 23, 2000; EU: April 7, 2000 | Release years by system: 1999 – Nintendo 64; 2023 – Nintendo Classics |
| Pokémon Stadium Original release dates: JP: April 30, 1999; NA: February 29, 2000; AU: March 23, 2000; EU: April 7, 2000 | Notes: Developed by Nintendo EAD.; Known in Japan as Pokemon Stadium 2 (Note: Japanese: ポケモンスタヅアム２, Hepburn: Pokemon Sutajiamu 2) |
| Pokémon Stadium 2 Original release dates: JP: December 14, 2000; NA: March 28, 2001; EU: October 10, 2001 | Release years by system: 2000 – Nintendo 64; 2023 – Nintendo Classics |
| Pokémon Stadium 2 Original release dates: JP: December 14, 2000; NA: March 28, 2001; EU: October 10, 2001 | Notes: Developed by Nintendo EAD.; Known in Japan as Pokemon Stadium Gold and Silver (Note: Japanese: ポケモンスタジアム金銀, Hepburn: Pokemon Sutajiamu Kin Gin) |

| Game | Details |
|---|---|
| Pokémon Box: Ruby and Sapphire Original release dates: JP: May 30, 2003; NA: July 12, 2004; EU: May 14, 2004; AU: July 16, 2004 | Release years by system: 2003 – GameCube |
| Pokémon Box: Ruby and Sapphire Original release dates: JP: May 30, 2003; NA: July 12, 2004; EU: May 14, 2004; AU: July 16, 2004 | Notes: Developed by Nintendo EAD & Game Freak. |
| Pokémon Colosseum Original release dates: JP: November 21, 2003; NA: March 22, 2004; EU: May 14, 2004 | Release years by system: 2003 – GameCube |
| Pokémon Colosseum Original release dates: JP: November 21, 2003; NA: March 22, 2004; EU: May 14, 2004 | Notes: Developed by Genius Sonority. |
| Pokémon XD: Gale of Darkness Original release dates: JP: August 4, 2005; NA: October 3, 2005; AU: November 10, 2005; EU: November 18, 2005 | Release years by system: 2005 – GameCube |
| Pokémon XD: Gale of Darkness Original release dates: JP: August 4, 2005; NA: October 3, 2005; AU: November 10, 2005; EU: November 18, 2005 | Notes: Developed by Genius Sonority. |
| Pokémon Battle Revolution Original release dates: JP: December 14, 2006; NA: June 25, 2007; AU: November 22, 2007; EU: December 7, 2007 | Release years by system: 2006 – Wii |
| Pokémon Battle Revolution Original release dates: JP: December 14, 2006; NA: June 25, 2007; AU: November 22, 2007; EU: December 7, 2007 | Notes: Developed by Genius Sonority. |
| My Pokémon Ranch Original release dates: JP: March 28, 2008; NA: June 9, 2008; EU: July 4, 2008; AU: July 4, 2008 | Release years by system: 2008 – WiiWare |
| My Pokémon Ranch Original release dates: JP: March 28, 2008; NA: June 9, 2008; EU: July 4, 2008; AU: July 4, 2008 | Notes: Developed by Ambrella. |
| Pokémon Champions Original release date(s): WW: April 2026 | Release years by system: 2026 – Nintendo Switch, iOS, Android |
| Pokémon Champions Original release date(s): WW: April 2026 | Notes: Developed by The Pokémon Works, a subsidiary of The Pokémon Company. |

=== Trading Card Games ===
==== Pokémon Card GB series ====
| Game | Details |
|---|---|
| Pokémon Trading Card Game Original release dates: JP: December 18, 1998; NA: April 10, 2000; AU: July 11, 2014; EU: December 15, 2000 | Release years by system: 1998 – Game Boy Color; 2014 – 3DS Virtual Console; 2023 – Nintendo Classics |
| Pokémon Trading Card Game Original release dates: JP: December 18, 1998; NA: April 10, 2000; AU: July 11, 2014; EU: December 15, 2000 | Notes: Developed by Hudson Soft & Creatures Inc. |
| Pokémon Card GB2: Here Comes Great Team Rocket! Original release dates: JP: March 28, 2001 | Release years by system: 2001 – Game Boy Color |
| Pokémon Card GB2: Here Comes Great Team Rocket! Original release dates: JP: March 28, 2001 | Notes: Developed by Hudson Soft & Creatures Inc.; Only released in Japan. |

==== Play It! series ====
| Game | Details |
|---|---|
| Pokémon Play It! Original release dates: EU: December 1999; NA: February 2000 | Release years by system: 1999 – Microsoft Windows |
| Pokémon Play It! Original release dates: EU: December 1999; NA: February 2000 | Notes: Developed by Fluid Entertainment. |
| Pokémon Play It! Version 2 Original release dates: EU: February 29, 2000; NA: February 29, 2000 | Release years by system: 2000 – Microsoft Windows |
| Pokémon Play It! Version 2 Original release dates: EU: February 29, 2000; NA: February 29, 2000 | Notes: Developed by Fluid Entertainment. |

==== Other Games ====
| Game | Details |
|---|---|
| Pokémon Card Game: How To Play DS Original release dates: JP: August 5, 2011 | Release years by system: 2011 – Nintendo DS |
| Pokémon Card Game: How To Play DS Original release dates: JP: August 5, 2011 | Notes: Developed by ZENER WORKS and Creatures Inc.; Only released in Japan. |
| Pokémon Trading Card Game Card Dex Original release dates: WW: February 8, 2019 | Release years by system: 2019 – iOS, Android |
| Pokémon Trading Card Game Card Dex Original release dates: WW: February 8, 2019 | Notes: Developed by The Pokémon Company. |

=== Pinball games ===
| Game | Details |
|---|---|
| Pokémon Pinball Original release dates: JP: April 14, 1999; NA: June 28, 1999; AU: July 13, 1999; EU: October 6, 2000 | Release years by system: 1999 – Game Boy Color |
| Pokémon Pinball Original release dates: JP: April 14, 1999; NA: June 28, 1999; AU: July 13, 1999; EU: October 6, 2000 | Notes: Developed by Jupiter Corporation & HAL Laboratory. |
| Pokémon Pinball: Ruby & Sapphire Original release dates: JP: August 1, 2003; NA: August 25, 2003; EU: November 14, 2003; AU: September 26, 2003 | Release years by system: 2003 – Game Boy Advance; 2015 – Wii U Virtual Console |
| Pokémon Pinball: Ruby & Sapphire Original release dates: JP: August 1, 2003; NA: August 25, 2003; EU: November 14, 2003; AU: September 26, 2003 | Notes: Developed by Jupiter Corporation. |

=== Mystery Dungeon series ===
| Game | Details |
|---|---|
| Pokémon Mystery Dungeon: Blue Rescue Team and Red Rescue Team Original release dates: JP: November 17, 2005; NA: September 18, 2006; AU: September 28, 2006; EU: November 10, 2006 | Release years by system: 2005 – Game Boy Advance, Nintendo DS; 2016 – Wii U Virtual Console; 2024 – Nintendo Classics (Red Rescue Team only) |
| Pokémon Mystery Dungeon: Blue Rescue Team and Red Rescue Team Original release dates: JP: November 17, 2005; NA: September 18, 2006; AU: September 28, 2006; EU: November 10, 2006 | Notes: Released on 2 separate platforms: Red Rescue Team was released on Game Boy Advance.; Blue Rescue Team was released on Nintendo DS.; Developed by Chunsoft. |
| Pokémon Mystery Dungeon: Explorers of Time and Explorers of Darkness Original release dates: JP: September 13, 2007; NA: April 20, 2008; EU: July 4, 2008; AU: June 19, 2008 | Release years by system: 2007 – Nintendo DS |
| Pokémon Mystery Dungeon: Explorers of Time and Explorers of Darkness Original release dates: JP: September 13, 2007; NA: April 20, 2008; EU: July 4, 2008; AU: June 19, 2008 | Notes: Developed by Chunsoft. |
| Pokémon Mystery Dungeon: Explorers of Sky Original release dates: JP: April 18, 2009; NA: October 12, 2009; EU: November 20, 2009; AU: November 12, 2009 | Release years by system: 2009 – Nintendo DS; 2016 – Wii U Virtual Console |
| Pokémon Mystery Dungeon: Explorers of Sky Original release dates: JP: April 18, 2009; NA: October 12, 2009; EU: November 20, 2009; AU: November 12, 2009 | Notes: Enhanced remake of Pokémon Mystery Dungeon: Explorers of Time and Explorers of Darkness.; Developed by Chunsoft. |
| Pokémon Mystery Dungeon: Advance! Fire Adventure Team, Go! Storm Adventure Team, and Aim! Light Adventure Team Original release date: JP: August 4, 2009 | Release years by system: 2009 – WiiWare |
| Pokémon Mystery Dungeon: Advance! Fire Adventure Team, Go! Storm Adventure Team, and Aim! Light Adventure Team Original release date: JP: August 4, 2009 | Notes: First Pokémon Mystery Dungeon game on a home console.; Developed by Chunsoft.; Only released in Japan. |
| Pokémon Mystery Dungeon: Gates to Infinity Original release dates: JP: November 23, 2012; NA: March 24, 2013; EU: May 17, 2013; AU: May 18, 2013 | Release years by system: 2012 – Nintendo 3DS |
| Pokémon Mystery Dungeon: Gates to Infinity Original release dates: JP: November 23, 2012; NA: March 24, 2013; EU: May 17, 2013; AU: May 18, 2013 | Notes: First Pokémon Mystery Dungeon game for the Nintendo 3DS.; Developed by Spike Chunsoft. |
| Pokémon Super Mystery Dungeon Original release dates: JP: September 17, 2015; NA: November 20, 2015; EU: February 19, 2016; AU: February 20, 2016 | Release years by system: 2015 – Nintendo 3DS |
| Pokémon Super Mystery Dungeon Original release dates: JP: September 17, 2015; NA: November 20, 2015; EU: February 19, 2016; AU: February 20, 2016 | Notes: First Pokémon Mystery Dungeon game to have (at the time) all 720 Pokémon, all of which could be recruited.; Developed by Spike Chunsoft. |
| Pokémon Mystery Dungeon: Rescue Team DX Original release date: WW: March 6, 2020 | Release years by system: 2020 – Nintendo Switch |
| Pokémon Mystery Dungeon: Rescue Team DX Original release date: WW: March 6, 2020 | Notes: Remake of the 2005 video games Pokémon Mystery Dungeon: Blue Rescue Team and Red Rescue Team.; First remake of a Pokémon game outside of the core series.; Developed by Spike Chunsoft. |

=== Ranger series ===
| Game | Details |
|---|---|
| Pokémon Ranger Original release dates: JP: March 23, 2006; NA: October 30, 2006; AU: December 7, 2006; EU: April 13, 2007 | Release years by system: 2006 – Nintendo DS; 2016 – Wii U Virtual Console |
| Pokémon Ranger Original release dates: JP: March 23, 2006; NA: October 30, 2006; AU: December 7, 2006; EU: April 13, 2007 | Notes: Developed by HAL Laboratory and Creatures Inc. |
| Pokémon Ranger: Shadows of Almia Original release dates: JP: March 20, 2008; NA: November 10, 2008; AU: November 13, 2008; EU: November 21, 2008 | Release years by system: 2008 – Nintendo DS; 2016 – Wii U Virtual Console |
| Pokémon Ranger: Shadows of Almia Original release dates: JP: March 20, 2008; NA: November 10, 2008; AU: November 13, 2008; EU: November 21, 2008 | Notes: Developed by Creatures Inc. |
| Pokémon Ranger: Guardian Signs Original release dates: JP: March 6, 2010; NA: October 4, 2010; EU: November 5, 2010; AU: November 25, 2010 | Release years by system: 2010 – Nintendo DS; 2016 – Wii U Virtual Console |
| Pokémon Ranger: Guardian Signs Original release dates: JP: March 6, 2010; NA: October 4, 2010; EU: November 5, 2010; AU: November 25, 2010 | Notes: Developed by Creatures Inc. |

=== Rumble series ===
| Game | Details |
|---|---|
| Pokémon Rumble Original release dates: JP: June 16, 2009; NA: November 16, 2009; EU: November 20, 2009 | Release years by system: 2009 – WiiWare |
| Pokémon Rumble Original release dates: JP: June 16, 2009; NA: November 16, 2009; EU: November 20, 2009 | Notes: Developed by Ambrella.; Known as Melee! Pokémon Scramble in Japan. |
| Pokémon Rumble Blast Original release dates: JP: August 11, 2011; NA: October 24, 2011; EU: December 2, 2011 | Release years by system: 2011 – Nintendo 3DS |
| Pokémon Rumble Blast Original release dates: JP: August 11, 2011; NA: October 24, 2011; EU: December 2, 2011 | Notes: Developed by Ambrella.; Known as Super Pokémon Scramble in Japan and as Super Pokémon Rumble in the PAL region.; Sequel to Pokémon Rumble. |
| Pokémon Rumble U Original release dates: JP: April 24, 2013; PAL: August 15, 2013; NA: August 29, 2013 | Release years by system: 2013 – Wii U |
| Pokémon Rumble U Original release dates: JP: April 24, 2013; PAL: August 15, 2013; NA: August 29, 2013 | Notes: Developed by Ambrella.; Known as Pokémon Scramble U in Japan.; Sequel to Pokémon Rumble Blast. |
| Pokémon Rumble World Original release date: WW: April 8, 2015 | Release years by system: 2015 – Nintendo 3DS |
| Pokémon Rumble World Original release date: WW: April 8, 2015 | Notes: Developed by Ambrella.; Known as Everyone's Pokémon Scramble in Japan.; Sequel to Pokémon Rumble U.; Originally released on the 3DS eShop as a freemium game in 2015, but physical retail versions were later released in 2016. |
| Pokémon Rumble Rush Original release date(s): AU: May 15, 2019; WW: May 22, 2019 | Release years by system: 2019 – Android, iOS |
| Pokémon Rumble Rush Original release date(s): AU: May 15, 2019; WW: May 22, 2019 | Notes: Developed by Ambrella.; First released in Australia and New Zealand.; Retired as of July 21, 2020. |

=== Snap series ===
| Game | Details |
|---|---|
| Pokémon Snap Original release dates: JP: March 21, 1999; NA: June 30, 1999; PAL: September 15, 2000 | Release years by system: 1999 – Nintendo 64; 2007 – Wii Virtual Console; 2017 – Wii U Virtual Console; 2022 – Nintendo Classics |
| Pokémon Snap Original release dates: JP: March 21, 1999; NA: June 30, 1999; PAL: September 15, 2000 | Notes: Developed by HAL Laboratory. |
| New Pokémon Snap Original release date: WW: April 30, 2021 | Release years by system: 2021 – Nintendo Switch |
| New Pokémon Snap Original release date: WW: April 30, 2021 | Notes: Developed by Bandai Namco Studios. |

=== Puzzle games ===
==== Pokémon Puzzle League series ====
| Game | Details |
|---|---|
| Pokémon Puzzle League Original release dates: NA: September 25, 2000; EU: March 16, 2001 | Release years by system: 2000 – Nintendo 64; 2008 – Wii Virtual Console |
| Pokémon Puzzle League Original release dates: NA: September 25, 2000; EU: March 16, 2001 | Notes: Developed by Nintendo Software Technology.; Featuring characters from the Pokémon anime. |
| Pokémon Puzzle Challenge Original release dates: JP: September 21, 2000; NA: December 4, 2000; PAL: June 15, 2001 | Release years by system: 2000 – Game Boy Color; 2014 – 3DS Virtual Console |
| Pokémon Puzzle Challenge Original release dates: JP: September 21, 2000; NA: December 4, 2000; PAL: June 15, 2001 | Notes: Developed by Intelligent Systems. |

==== Pokémon Trozei series ====
| Game | Details |
|---|---|
| Pokémon Trozei! Original release dates: JP: October 20, 2005; NA: March 6, 2006; EU: May 5, 2006; AU: April 28, 2006 | Release years by system: 2005 – Nintendo DS |
| Pokémon Trozei! Original release dates: JP: October 20, 2005; NA: March 6, 2006; EU: May 5, 2006; AU: April 28, 2006 | Notes: Developed by Genius Sonority. |
| Pokémon Battle Trozei Original release date: JP: March 12, 2014; EU: March 13, 2014; NA: March 20, 2014; AU: March 14, 2014 | Release years by system: 2014 – Nintendo 3DS |
| Pokémon Battle Trozei Original release date: JP: March 12, 2014; EU: March 13, 2014; NA: March 20, 2014; AU: March 14, 2014 | Notes: Developed by Genius Sonority. |

==== Other puzzle games ====
| Game | Details |
|---|---|
| Pokémon Shuffle Original release date: WW: February 18, 2015 | Release years by system: 2015 – Nintendo 3DS, iOS, Android |
| Pokémon Shuffle Original release date: WW: February 18, 2015 | Notes: Developed by Genius Sonority. |
| Pokémon Picross Original release dates: JP: December 2, 2015; NA: December 3, 2015; EU: December 3, 2015; AU: December 4, 2015 | Release years by system: 2015 – Nintendo 3DS |
| Pokémon Picross Original release dates: JP: December 2, 2015; NA: December 3, 2015; EU: December 3, 2015; AU: December 4, 2015 | Notes: Developed by Jupiter Corporation.; Another game known as "Pokémon Picross" was also developed for release in 1999 for the Game Boy Color, but was ultimately cancelled. |
| Pokémon Café Mix Original release date(s): WW: June 23, 2020 | Release years by system: 2020 - Nintendo Switch, Android, iOS |
| Pokémon Café Mix Original release date(s): WW: June 23, 2020 | Notes: Developed by Genius Sonority. |

=== PokéPark series ===
| Game | Details |
|---|---|
| PokéPark Wii: Pikachu's Adventure Original release dates: JP: December 5, 2009; EU: July 9, 2010; NA: November 1, 2010; AU: September 23, 2010 | Release years by system: 2009 – Wii; 2016 – Wii U Virtual Console |
| PokéPark Wii: Pikachu's Adventure Original release dates: JP: December 5, 2009; EU: July 9, 2010; NA: November 1, 2010; AU: September 23, 2010 | Notes: Developed by Creatures Inc. |
| PokéPark 2: Wonders Beyond Original release dates: JP: November 12, 2011; NA: February 27, 2012; EU: March 23, 2012; AU: March 29, 2012 | Release years by system: 2011 – Wii |
| PokéPark 2: Wonders Beyond Original release dates: JP: November 12, 2011; NA: February 27, 2012; EU: March 23, 2012; AU: March 29, 2012 | Notes: Included fifth generation Pokémon and 4 different playable characters.; Developed by Creatures Inc.; Sequel to PokéPark Wii: Pikachu's Adventure. |

=== Pikachu series ===
| Game | Details |
|---|---|
| Hey You, Pikachu! Original release dates: JP: December 12, 1998; NA: November 6, 2000 | Release years by system: 1998 – Nintendo 64 |
| Hey You, Pikachu! Original release dates: JP: December 12, 1998; NA: November 6, 2000 | Notes: Developed by Ambrella. |
| Pokémon Channel Original release dates: JP: July 18, 2003; NA: December 1, 2003; EU: April 2, 2004 | Release years by system: 2003 – GameCube |
| Pokémon Channel Original release dates: JP: July 18, 2003; NA: December 1, 2003; EU: April 2, 2004 | Notes: Developed by Ambrella.; Included a built in Pokémon Mini emulator |

=== Detective Pikachu games ===
| Game | Details |
|---|---|
| Detective Pikachu Original release date(s): JP: February 3, 2016; NA: March 23, 2018; EU: March 23, 2018; AU: March 24, 2018 | Release years by system: 2016 – Nintendo 3DS |
| Detective Pikachu Original release date(s): JP: February 3, 2016; NA: March 23, 2018; EU: March 23, 2018; AU: March 24, 2018 | Notes: Developed by Creatures Inc.; The game was partially released in Japan on February 3, 2016 as Meitantei Pikachu: Shin Konbi Tanjō. The rest of the game was released in Japan on March 23, 2018, alongside the international release of the full game. The game also has a movie based on it. |
| Detective Pikachu Returns Original release date(s): WW: October 6, 2023 | Release years by system: 2023 - Nintendo Switch |
| Detective Pikachu Returns Original release date(s): WW: October 6, 2023 | Notes: Developed by Creatures Inc. |

=== Pokémon Mini games ===
| Game | Details |
|---|---|
| Pokémon Party mini Original release date(s): JP: December 14, 2001; NA: November 16, 2001; EU: March 15, 2002 | Release years by system: 2001 - Pokémon Mini |
| Pokémon Party mini Original release date(s): JP: December 14, 2001; NA: November 16, 2001; EU: March 15, 2002 | Notes: Developed by Denyusha |
| Pokémon Pinball mini Original release date(s): JP: December 14, 2001; NA: November 16, 2001; EU: March 15, 2002 | Release years by system: 2001 - Pokémon Mini |
| Pokémon Pinball mini Original release date(s): JP: December 14, 2001; NA: November 16, 2001; EU: March 15, 2002 | Notes: Developed by Jupiter Corporation; Also part of the Pokémon Pinball series |
| Pokémon Puzzle Collection Original release date(s): JP: December 14, 2001; NA: November 16, 2001; EU: March 15, 2002 | Release years by system: 2001 - Pokémon Mini |
| Pokémon Puzzle Collection Original release date(s): JP: December 14, 2001; NA: November 16, 2001; EU: March 15, 2002 | Notes: Developed by Jupiter Corporation |
| Pokémon Zany Cards Original release date(s): JP: December 14, 2001; NA: November 16, 2001; EU: March 15, 2002 | Release years by system: 2001 - Pokémon Mini |
| Pokémon Zany Cards Original release date(s): JP: December 14, 2001; NA: November 16, 2001; EU: March 15, 2002 | Notes: Developed by Denyusha |
| Pokémon Tetris Original release date(s): JP: March 21, 2002; EU: March 15, 2002 | Release years by system: 2002 - Pokémon Mini |
| Pokémon Tetris Original release date(s): JP: March 21, 2002; EU: March 15, 2002 | Notes: Developed by Nintendo |
| Pokémon Puzzle Collection vol. 2 Original release date(s): JP: April 26, 2002 | Release years by system: 2002 - Pokémon Mini |
| Pokémon Puzzle Collection vol. 2 Original release date(s): JP: April 26, 2002 | Notes: Developed by Jupiter Corporation |
| Pokémon Race mini Original release date(s): JP: July 19, 2002 | Release years by system: 2002 - Pokémon Mini |
| Pokémon Race mini Original release date(s): JP: July 19, 2002 | Notes: Developed by Jupiter Corporation |
| Pichu Bros. mini Original release date(s): JP: August 9, 2002 | Release years by system: 2002 - Pokémon Mini |
| Pichu Bros. mini Original release date(s): JP: August 9, 2002 | Notes: Developed by Denyusha |
| Togepi's Great Adventure Original release date(s): JP: October 18, 2002 | Release years by system: 2002 - Pokémon Mini |
| Togepi's Great Adventure Original release date(s): JP: October 18, 2002 | Notes: Developed by Jupiter Corporation |
| Pokémon Breeder mini Original release date(s): JP: December 14, 2002 | Release years by system: 2002 - Pokémon Mini |
| Pokémon Breeder mini Original release date(s): JP: December 14, 2002 | Notes: Developed by Jupiter Corporation |

=== Arcade games ===
==== Puck series ====
| Game | Details |
|---|---|
| Pokémon Battrio Original release date: JP: November 21, 2007 | Release years by system: 2007 – Arcade |
| Pokémon Battrio Original release date: JP: November 21, 2007 | Notes: Developed by Takara Tomy and AQ Interactive.; Only released in Japan.; Played more than 100 million times, grossing more than ¥10 billion ($125 million) by 2012. |
| Pokémon Tretta Original release date: JP: July 14, 2012 | Release years by system: 2012 – Arcade |
| Pokémon Tretta Original release date: JP: July 14, 2012 | Notes: Developed by Takara Tomy and Marvelous AQL.; Sequel to Pokémon Battrio.; Only released in Japan.; Exceeded 100 million plays in 800 days, grossing more than ¥10 billion ($125 million) by 2014. |
| Pokémon Tretta Lab Original release date: JP: August 10, 2013 | Release years by system: 2013 – Nintendo 3DS, Arcade |
| Pokémon Tretta Lab Original release date: JP: August 10, 2013 | Notes: Developed by Takara Tomy and Marvelous AQL.; Downloadable game that uses Pokémon Tretta tokens, and a separate hardware shell that is an analyzer and a scanner.; Only released in Japan. |
| Pokémon Ga-Olé Original release date(s): JP: July 7, 2016 | Release years by system: 2016 – Arcade |
| Pokémon Ga-Olé Original release date(s): JP: July 7, 2016 | Notes: Follows the gameplay from Pokémon Battrio and Pokémon Tretta.; Developed by Takara Tomy and Marvelous.; Only released in Japan.; Exceeded 100 million plays in 600 days, grossing more than ¥10 billion ($92 million) by 2018. |

==== Pokkén Tournament ====
| Game | Details |
|---|---|
| Pokkén Tournament Original release dates: JP: July 16, 2015 (Arcade); WW: March 18, 2016 (Wii U) | Release years by system: 2015 – Arcade; 2016 – Wii U |
| Pokkén Tournament Original release dates: JP: July 16, 2015 (Arcade); WW: March 18, 2016 (Wii U) | Notes: Developed by Bandai Namco Studios. |
| Pokkén Tournament DX Original release date: WW: September 22, 2017 | Release years by system: 2017 – Nintendo Switch |
| Pokkén Tournament DX Original release date: WW: September 22, 2017 | Notes: Developed by Bandai Namco Studios. |

==== Mezastar ====
| Game | Details |
|---|---|
| Pokémon Mezastar Original release dates: JP: September 17, 2020; CN/HK/IDN/MY/SG/TW: April 1, 2025; KR: July 1, 2025 | Release years by system: 2020 – Arcade |
| Pokémon Mezastar Original release dates: JP: September 17, 2020; CN/HK/IDN/MY/SG/TW: April 1, 2025; KR: July 1, 2025 | Notes: Developed by Takara Tomy and Marvelous.; Ended in Japan on April 18, 2024 and succeeded by Pokémon Friends.; Released in several countries from April 2025.; Exceeded 100 million plays in 451 days, grossing more than ¥20 billion ($187 million) by 2021. |

==== Friends ====
| Game | Details |
|---|---|
| Pokémon Friends Original release dates: JP: July 11, 2024 | Release years by system: 2024 – Arcade |
| Pokémon Friends Original release dates: JP: July 11, 2024 | Notes: Developed by Takara Tomy and Marvelous.; Exceeded 100 million plays in one year. |

=== Mobile games ===
==== Pokédex 3D and Pokédex 3D Pro ====
Pokédex 3D is an app available for download from the Nintendo eShop. It is a Pokédex, which displays information on Pokémon from Black and White as well as a 3D model. Only a few Pokémon are initially available, and more can be unlocked through means such as SpotPass and StreetPass and AR cards.

On April 21, 2012, Nintendo announced that there would be a National Pokédex version called Pokédex 3D Pro. It was released in Japan on the Nintendo eShop on July 14, 2012, and internationally on November 8, 2012. Unlike the original, the Pro edition of the app is not free, and all Pokémon are available from the start rather than unlocking them over time, although some that are not available can be unlocked by entering a special code on the official website. In addition, it has new background music, modes, more scenes and backgrounds and features the voice for the name of every Pokémon. The Pro edition replaced the original free app as it was removed from the eShop on June 17, 2012, in Japan and on October 1, 2012, internationally. An official iOS version was released on November 15, 2012, but was delisted on November 30, 2015.

==== Pokémon Dream Radar ====
Pokémon Dream Radar (ポケモン ARサーチャー Pokemon AR Sāchā, literally meaning: "Pokémon Augmented Reality Searcher") is the second downloadable game in the series and it featured Augmented Reality view to capture Pokémon, collecting Dream Orbs and Items in the Interdream Zone. Pokémon Dream Radar allows you to transfer any Pokémon you've captured and any Items you've obtained to a copy of Pokémon Black and White 2 inserted in the Nintendo 3DS cartridge slot to give the players extra in-game content.

==== Pokémon Bank ====
Pokémon Bank is a mobile application available on the Nintendo eShop for Nintendo 3DS. It was released in Japan, South Korea, and Taiwan on December 25, 2013, Hong Kong on January 22, 2014, Europe, Australia, and New Zealand on February 4, 2014, and in North and South America on February 5, 2014. It is an online storage system which allows players to store up to 3000 Pokémon and access requires a stable internet connection. The app was free to download, but required an annual fee in order to access the servers. Bank is compatible with Pokémon X, Y, Omega Ruby, Alpha Sapphire, Sun, Moon, Ultra Sun and Ultra Moon and the game's Pokémon Storage System. Pokémon holding items and a cosplay variant of Pikachu cannot be stored. The additional app Poké Transporter allows players to transfer Pokémon from Pokémon Black, White, Black 2 and White 2 and the Virtual Console releases of Pokémon Red, Blue, and Yellow. Pokémon Bank was later updated to add Poké Transporter capabilities for Gold, Silver, and Crystal as well. Bank became unavailable for download and free of charge March 27, 2023, along with the closing of the 3DS eShop. In August 2026, Nintendo announced Pokémon Bank service will end on February 25, 2027.

==== Pokémon Photo Booth ====
Pokémon Photo Booth is a mobile app that revolves around a photo editor. The player can add filters and pre-made or custom banners to photos. It was released in February 2016, to celebrate Pokémon's 20th Anniversary.

==== Pokémon Go ====
The augmented reality mobile game Pokémon Go was released in July 2016 on both Android and iOS platforms. It utilizes internal GPS tracking system in order to find and catch Pokémon in real-time. The system places in-game locations such as Gyms and Pokéstops in predetermined locations (such as landmarks) throughout the real world in order to get the player active and become a Pokémon trainer in real life. The Pokémon themselves spawn randomly, with some conditions; nocturnal Pokémon have a higher chance to spawn at night, and water type pokémon may spawn close to water. Gyms are used to battle and train Pokémon against other players in the area, and nearby PokéStops give free items when spun (they have a 5-minute cooldown per use). It originally featured all generation I Pokémon. In February 2017, generation II Pokémon were added excluding the legendaries of the region, including Suicune, Raikou, Entei, Celebi, Lugia, and Ho-Oh. In July 2017, the missing Legendary Pokémon from the Johto region were added. Niantic has since added Pokémon from the Hoenn, Sinnoh, Unova, Kalos, Alola, Galar, Hisui, and Paldea regions into Pokémon Go. While the title is free-to-play, it also implements microtransactions, allowing players to spend real currency to gain access to more items in game. The game was met with mixed responses when released. In September 2016, Niantic released the Pokémon Go Plus, a $35 wearable, which issues alerts about any events in the game, including the appearance of a Pokémon or nearby PokéStop.

==== Pokémon Duel ====
On January 24, 2017, Pokémon Duel, a competitive digital board game was released for mobile devices on the App Store and Google Play. Pokémon Duel, formerly known as Pokémon Co-master, was co-developed with Heroz Japan, a company that specializes in artificial intelligence. Based on the Pokémon Trading Figure board game, players can move Pokémon pieces around a virtual playing field. Upon reaching an opponent's Pokémon, the two may engage in battle. The strategy game lets one play single-player against the computer or compete with other players online. The game was discontinued on October 31, 2019.

==== Pokémon Playhouse ====
In 2017, Nintendo, together with the Pokémon Company, announced the creation of a mobile app targeted at preschool aged children called Pokémon Playhouse.

==== Pokémon Masters EX ====
On August 29, 2019, Pokémon Masters, a 3-on-3 battle game was released on the App Store and Google Play. Pokémon Masters was developed by DeNA. The game can be downloaded from the Pokémon Masters official website Originally named Pokémon Masters, it was renamed Pokémon Masters EX in August 2020 on the 1st anniversary of the game.

==== Camp Pokémon ====
Camp Pokémon, known as Pokémon Camp in Europe, Australia, and New Zealand, is a free app provided by The Pokémon Company International for Android and iOS. It was first accessible to iOS users on October 21, 2014, and was released for Android devices on April 14, 2016.

==== Pokémon Home ====
In June 2019, The Pokémon Company announced a new cloud service for storing Pokémon, intended to replace Pokémon Bank. It was later revealed the service would be called Pokémon Home and was released for Nintendo Switch, iOS, and Android. Home would be available in two tiers, a paid premium subscription and a free tier with less storage and a limited feature set. A subscription to Nintendo Switch Online would not be required to use Pokémon Home. It was released in February 2020. The service is primarily aimed toward Pokémon Sword and Shield and Pokémon can be transferred between them and the service at will. Pokémon contained in Pokémon Bank can be transferred to Home but would be a one-way transfer and cannot be transferred back to the aforementioned titles. The same can be said about Pokémon transferred from the Let's Go, Pikachu! and Let's Go, Eevee! titles, except this one way transfer system only applies after you transfer a Pokémon into Pokémon Home, then into Pokémon Sword and Shield. On November 11, 2020, Niantic released an update for Pokémon Go that allows the unidirectional transfer of Pokémon to Pokémon Home.

==== Pokémon Smile ====
Pokémon Smile is a free app for Android and iOS devices. The game uses the device's camera to play the game. Players brush their teeth to rescue Pokémon from bacteria. The game was announced during a Pokémon Presents presentation on June 17, 2020, and was made available later the same day.

==== Pokémon Trading Card Game Pocket ====
Pokémon Trading Card Game Pocket is a free-to-play mobile adaptation of the Pokémon Trading Card Game. In game, players can construct decks, acquire cards, and fight other players. The game was announced on February 27, 2024 during a Pokémon Presents presentation and was released on October 30, 2024.

=== PC titles ===
==== Pokémon TCG Online ====
Pokémon TCG Online is the official digital version of the Pokémon Trading Card Game available for PC, iOS, and Android. As of early 2023, the game had received its final expansion set, and was planned to be discontinued in the near future. On June 7, 2023, the game was officially discontinued. This was partially due to the application's age, and the arrival of its recent replacement, Pokémon TCG Live, which has been met with mixed opinions from the entire playerbase.

==== Pokémon PokéROM Gotta Learn 'em All! ====
Pokémon PokéROM Gotta Learn 'em All! is a series of playable and collectable mini CD-ROMs released by Mattel Interactive in 2000.

==== Pokémon 2000 ====
Pokémon 2000 was a first-person online only adventure game released by Cyberworld International Corporation in 2000. Created as a promotion for the second Pokémon film for AOL Time Warner, Pokémon 2000 played within Cyberworld's specialized web browser which could display web pages on one side and simple Wolfenstein 3D like 3D worlds on the other. Due to a contract dispute, the game was pulled and is no longer able to be played after being available for four weeks with over one million downloads. The game was presumed lost until it was found in 2023 by a developer and was preserved.

==== Pokémon Project Studio ====
Pokémon Project Studio is a computer program released by The Learning Company on November 9, 1999, in the U.S. This program lets the user create all kinds of Pokémon related projects such as calendars or greeting cards. Each version had stock artwork of different Generation I Pokémon. Some Pokémon were version-specific—for example, Kangaskhan was only available in the Blue version, whereas Tauros was only available in the Red version. Stock art of human characters like Ash Ketchum and Professor Oak was also included, and users could also add photos and images saved on their own computer.

==== Pokémon: Masters Arena ====
Pokémon: Masters Arena is a Pokémon game compilation developed by ImaginEngine designed for young children. It contains eight games, testing the players' knowledge to prove themselves as a true Pokémon Master. On mastering all eight games, the player earns 8 posters, which can be printed.

==== Pokémon: Team Turbo ====
Team Turbo is a Pokémon game developed by ImaginEngine that is a game compilation designed for young children. It contains five racing games which are used to earn power-ups for use in race courses. From the main menu, one can choose to do any of the 6 races, any of the 5 minigames, or do an "Adventure Mode" in which there are races in order, with minigames in between each to earn extra powerups. The game was published by ValuSoft and released in October 2005.

==== Pokémon PC Master ====
Pokémon PC Master is a Pokémon game released on June 20, 2006, in Japan. It is supposed to improve children's knowledge of information technology.

==== Perdue series ====
===== Pokémon Team Rocket Blast Off =====
Pokémon Team Rocket Blast Off is a Pokémon game released in North America.

===== Pokémon Poké Ball Launcher =====
Pokémon Poké Ball Launcher is a Pokémon game released in North America.

===== Pokémon Seek & Find =====
Pokémon Seek & Find is a Pokémon game released in North America.

==== Pokémon Card Game Online ====
Pokémon Card Game Online is a Pokémon game released on November 20, 2009, in Japan.

==== Pokémon Medallion Battle ====
Pokémon Medallion Battle is a Pokémon game released worldwide on December 23, 2019.

==== Pokémon Tower Battle ====
Pokémon Tower Battle is a Pokémon game released worldwide on December 23, 2019.

=== Sega games ===
Seven Pokémon games were released for Sega game consoles.

==== Sega Pico series ====
| Game | Details |
|---|---|
| Pokémon: Catch the Numbers! Original release date: JP: July 23, 2002 | Release years by system: 2002 - Sega Pico |
| Pokémon Advanced Generation: I've Begun Hiragana and Katakana! Original release date: JP: November 17, 2003 | Release years by system: 2003 - Sega Pico |
| Pokémon Advanced Generation: Pico for Everyone Pokémon Loud Battle! Original release date: JP: July 13, 2004 | Release years by system: 2004 - Sega Pico |

==== Advanced Pico Beena series ====
| Game | Details |
|---|---|
| Pokémon Advanced Generation: Pokémon Number Battle! Original release date: JP: October 1, 2005 | Release years by system: 2005 - Advanced Pico Beena |
| Intellectual Training Drill Pokémon Diamond and Pearl: Letter and Number Intelligence Game Original release date: JP: April 21, 2007 | Release years by system: 2007 - Advanced Pico Beena |
| Pokémon Diamond and Pearl: Search for Pokémon! Adventure in the Maze! Original release date: JP: September 17, 2009 | Release years by system: 2009 - Advanced Pico Beena |
| Pokémon Best Wishes: Intelligence Training Pokémon Big Sports Meet! Original release date: JP: December 4, 2010 | Release years by system: 2010 - Advanced Pico Beena |

=== Other spin-offs ===
| Game | Details |
|---|---|
| Pokémon Dash Original release dates: JP: December 2, 2004; EU: March 11, 2005; NA: March 13, 2005; AU: April 7, 2005 | Release years by system: 2004 – Nintendo DS |
| Pokémon Dash Original release dates: JP: December 2, 2004; EU: March 11, 2005; NA: March 13, 2005; AU: April 7, 2005 | Notes: Developed by Ambrella.; First appearance of a fourth generation Pokémon (Munchlax). |
| Pokémate Original release date: JP: December 31, 2006 | Release years by system: 2006 – Mobile phone |
| Pokémate Original release date: JP: December 31, 2006 | Notes: Developed by Square Enix.; Only released in Japan. |
| Learn with Pokémon: Typing Adventure Original release dates: JP: April 21, 2011; EU: September 21, 2012 | Release years by system: 2011 – Nintendo DS |
| Learn with Pokémon: Typing Adventure Original release dates: JP: April 21, 2011; EU: September 21, 2012 | Notes: Each copy of the game was bundled with a wireless keyboard.; Developed by Genius Sonority. |
| Pokémon Conquest Original release dates: JP: March 17, 2012; NA: June 18, 2012; AU: June 21, 2012; EU: July 27, 2012 | Release years by system: 2012 – Nintendo DS |
| Pokémon Conquest Original release dates: JP: March 17, 2012; NA: June 18, 2012; AU: June 21, 2012; EU: July 27, 2012 | Notes: Developed by Tecmo Koei.; Crossover with the Nobunaga's Ambition strategy series.; Known in Japan as Pokemon Plus - Nobunaga no Yabou. |
| Pokémon Art Academy Original release dates: JP: June 19, 2014; EU: July 4, 2014; AU: July 5, 2014; NA: October 24, 2014 | Release years by system: 2014 – Nintendo 3DS |
| Pokémon Art Academy Original release dates: JP: June 19, 2014; EU: July 4, 2014; AU: July 5, 2014; NA: October 24, 2014 | Notes: Developed by Headstrong Games. |
| Pokémon: Magikarp Jump Original release date(s): WW: May 24, 2017 | Release years by system: 2017 – Android, iOS |
| Pokémon: Magikarp Jump Original release date(s): WW: May 24, 2017 | Notes: Developed by Select Button. |
| Pokémon Quest Original release date(s): WW: May 30, 2018 | Release years by system: 2018 - Nintendo Switch, Android, iOS |
| Pokémon Quest Original release date(s): WW: May 30, 2018 | Notes: Developed by Game Freak. |
| Pokémon Unite Original release date(s): WW: July 21, 2021 | Release years by system: 2021 - Nintendo Switch, iOS, Android |
| Pokémon Unite Original release date(s): WW: July 21, 2021 | Notes: Developed by Tencent and TiMi Studios. |
| Pokémon Pokopia Original release date(s): WW: March 5, 2026 | Release years by system: 2026 - Nintendo Switch 2 |
| Pokémon Pokopia Original release date(s): WW: March 5, 2026 | Notes: Developed by Omega Force and Game Freak. |
