= Pokémon Wii =

Pokémon Wii may refer to four different video games in the Pokémon series of video games for the Wii.

- Pokémon Rumble, released in 2009
- Pokémon Battle Revolution, released in 2007
- PokéPark Wii: Pikachu's Adventure, released in 2010
- PokéPark 2: Wonders Beyond, released in 2012
