= Pokémon WiiWare =

Pokémon WiiWare may refer to two different video games in the Pokémon series of video games for the WiiWare.

- My Pokémon Ranch, released in 2008
- Pokémon Rumble, released in 2009
