= Pokémon Wii U =

Pokémon Wii U may refer to two different video games in the Pokémon series of video games for the Wii U.

- Pokémon Rumble U, released in 2013
- Pokkén Tournament, released in 2016
