= Pokémon Dash =

2004 Pokémon racing videogame spin-off

- North American cover art
- Developer: Ambrella (Note: Co-produced and supervised by Nintendo Software Planning & Development.)
- Publishers: JP: The Pokémon Company; WW: Nintendo
- Directors: Muneaki Ozawa; Miki Obata; Shin Naka; Yoshihiro Hatta; Norio Matsumura; Kunimi Kawamura
- Producers: Kunimi Kawamura; Hitoshi Yamagami
- Designers: Miki Obata; Norio Matsumura
- Programmers: Takayuki Ito; Yosuke Suma; Nayuta Taga; Ein Terakawa; Hisato Matsumoto
- Composer: Miki Obata
- Series: Pokémon
- Platform: Nintendo DS
- Release: JP: December 2, 2004; EU: March 11, 2005; NA: March 14, 2005; AU: April 7, 2005
- Genre: Racing
- Modes: Single-player, multiplayer

Pokémon Dash (Note: Japanese: ポケモンダッシュ, Hepburn: Pokemon Dasshu) is a racing video game developed by Ambrella and published by The Pokémon Company and Nintendo for the Nintendo DS. It was a launch title both in Japan and Europe. Dash was released in Japan on December 2, 2004; Europe on March 11, 2005; North America on March 14, 2005; and Australia on April 7, 2005. It was the first Pokémon game to be released for the Nintendo DS.

The player uses a stylus to control a Pikachu and race through checkpoints. After players have passed each of the number of checkpoints in order, the course is completed. Dash has multiplayer support, and can connect with 6 different devices.

== Gameplay ==
Dash is a top-down perspective racing video game in which the player uses a stylus to control a Pikachu and race through checkpoints. After players have passed all the checkpoints in order, the course is completed. The stylus is used by moving the stylus in the direction the player wants Pikachu to run. Along with racing on the ground, there are races in the sky using balloons. There are many different terrains such as mazestone paths, forests, beaches, water, swamp, and lava pools. Throughout the courses are power ups which allow the player to run on different terrains without slowing down. Dash also features a training cup, which is given to players starting the game for the first time. After completing the training cup, the player has the chance to play in the Grand Prix Mode. There are five main cups to compete in GP mode. Dash also offers harder GP modes that can be unlocked, which put the player against a faster level of Pokémon. Each cup has five courses within its area.

=== Connectivity to other devices ===
Dash has multiplayer support. Up to six Nintendo DS units can be connected together if they all have a copy of the game. In the multiplayer mode, all players control an identical Pikachu.

Dash features compatibility with the Game Boy Advance games Pokémon Ruby, Sapphire, FireRed, LeafGreen, or Emerald. If the player inserts any of those cartridges in Slot 2, and has completed GP mode, they can play courses shaped like the Pokémon in their team. The time to complete the courses depends on factors like type and level.

== Development ==
Dash was developed for the Nintendo DS by Ambrella, who also developed Hey You, Pikachu! and Pokémon Channel. It was first revealed October 7, 2004, as a launch title for Japan. Dash was released in Japan on December 2, 2004; Europe on March 11, 2005; North America on March 14, 2005; and Australia on April 7, 2005. Before the North American release, The Pokémon Center had pre-order deals which included keychains and DS carrying pouches.

== Reception ==
Reception

Aggregate score
Aggregator	Score
Metacritic	46/100

Review scores
Publication	Score
Electronic Gaming Monthly	5.83/10 (Note: Three critics of Electronic Gaming Monthly gave the game each a score of 5/10, 6.5/10, and 6/10.)
Famitsu	31/40
Game Informer	5.5/10
GameRevolution	D−
GameSpot	5.2/10
GameSpy	2/5
IGN	5/10
Nintendo Power	2.8/5
Nintendo World Report	(US) 7/10 (JP) 3/10
X-Play	2/5
Detroit Free Press	1/4

The game received "generally unfavorable reviews" according to the review aggregation website Metacritic. In Japan, however, Famitsu gave it a score of one eight, one seven, and two eights for a total of 31 out of 40.

IGN's Craig Harris thought the player could only play as Pikachu in single player, and the game could also be finished within hours. GameSpot's Alex Navarro said that the game "is simply one of the laziest uses of the DS's touch screen technology to date". GamePro's Slo Mo said, "Dash might not make much of a splash, but it should be a good kid-pleaser." (Note: GamePro gave the game two 4/5 scores for graphics and control, and two 3.5/5 scores for sound and fun factor.) GameSpy's Phil Theobald said, "Gimmicky titles like this may be cute diversions, but they're no substitute for the real deal." Electronic Gaming Monthly called it a "cute and fun little racing game that has a great multiplayer component, but there's simply not enough to it." Nintendo Power said, "Controlling Pikachu with stylus strokes is actually quite fun, but as a racing game, Dash isn't fully realized." Game Informer called it more of an exercise in anger management than a game. While discussing the mixed quality of Pokémon spin-offs, Retronauts cited Pokémon Dash as an example.

By December 23, Dash had sold 109,000 units.
