= Pokémon Rumble =

2009 video game

- Developer: Ambrella
- Publishers: JP: The Pokémon Company; WW: Nintendo
- Director: Norio Matsumara
- Producers: Mikiko Ōhashi; Toshio Miyahara; Hiroaki Tsuru
- Designers: Miki Obata; Yoshihiro Hatta; Norio Matsumara; Watanabe Hirotake; Muneaki Ozawa
- Programmer: Nayuta Taga
- Composer: Miki Obata
- Series: Pokémon, Pokémon Rumble
- Platform: Wii
- Release: JP: June 16, 2009; NA: November 16, 2009; EU: November 20, 2009
- Genre: Action role-playing
- Modes: Single-player, Multiplayer

Pokémon Rumble (Note: Japanese: 乱戦！ポケモンスクランブル, Hepburn: Ransen! Pokemon Sukuranburu; lit. "Melee! Pokémon Scramble") is a 2009 action role-playing video game developed by Ambrella and published by The Pokémon Company and Nintendo for the Wii video game console. A spin-off of the mainline Pokémon series, players control Pokémon as wind-up toys that is sent into battle against waves of Pokémon across a set of linear stages and enclosed arenas, recruiting defeated foes to build up a roster of up to a thousand Pokémon.

Reception to Pokémon Rumble was mixed. Critcs generally enjoyed the game's hack-and-slash gameplay style and its high replay value from Pokémon collecting, but many felt its $15.00 USD price was too steep for a simple hack-and-slash gameplay style that recycled another game's assets. Pokémon Rumble was the first entry in the spinoff Rumble sub-series, followed by Pokémon Rumble Blast (2011), Pokémon Rumble U (2013), Pokémon Rumble World (2015), and the mobile game Pokémon Rumble Rush (2019).

== Gameplay ==
Screenshot showing Mew and Ivysaur fighting with the enemy Pokémon

The player controls Pokémon as they battle other Pokémon in a series of linear dungeons and enclosed arenas. The game features real-time melee-based gameplay, which has been likened to that of Smash TV.

The game uses a Wii Remote held sideways by default, but also supports the Nunchuk, Classic Controller (Pro) and GameCube Controller. Using one of the attachment controllers allows two players to share the same Wii Remote. Controllers can be changed at the Multiplayer booth in the Terminal area after finishing the first stage.

The player starts off with a low-level Pokémon with only one attack at their disposal. They can collect stronger Pokémon (with up to two moves) through defeating wild Pokémon within the game's levels. Additionally, by battling wild Pokémon the player collects coins which can be used to buy new attacks or recruit more Pokémon. When the player obtains a high enough level Pokémon, the doors to the Battle Royale room open, where they take on dozens of Pokémon at a time in an enclosed arena. The player must defeat all of the Pokémon in order to rank up, eventually facing much stronger and even Legendary Pokémon.

The game supports up to four players simultaneously in co-operative and competitive modes. It also features a password system which unlocks certain Pokémon. Passwords have been found in Nintendo Power magazines, the official game website, or online.

== Development ==
The game was originally planned to also have Pokémon from Gold and Silver and Ruby and Sapphire, but they were not implemented presumably due to WiiWare's 40 megabytes size limit. This gets proven further when it was discovered that the games collection booth was hard coded to not show Pokémon 152 through 388, and Arceus.

A free demo was available on the Wii Shop Channel. It included a number of functions including: The Normal Introduction, a few stages allowing the player to get the feeling of each stage. Pokémon can be recruited and the Terminal can be used. Once a Pokémon is recruited with Power Points of 100 or more, a short video is displayed in which the Battle Royale doors open and then a screenshot appears stating that the demo is over.

== Reception ==
Reception

Aggregate score
| Aggregator | Score |
|---|---|
| Metacritic | 59/100 |

Review score
| Publication | Score |
|---|---|
| IGN | 6/10 |

Pokémon Rumble received mixed reception from critics, with the game receiving an average score of 59 out of 100 on Metacritic based on nine reviews. Many of the critics discussion centered on whether the game's simple and repetitive hack-and-slash gameplay style justified its $15.00 USD price.

Jack DeVries of IGN gave Pokémon Rumble a 6/10, describing the game as "mindless, but fun" while acknowledging that it lacked depth to sustain interest, and criticized Ambrella for reusing character models from My Pokémon Ranch rather than creating new ones. Nintendo Life's Philip Reed had a more favorable view of Pokémon Rumble, awarding the game 8/10 and calling it "one of WiiWare's more substantial and replayable offerings". Reed acknowledged that the simplicity of the game's hack-and-slash style could make the combat repetitive, but argued that the range of available attacks meant this repetitiveness was largely self-imposed, and he praised the four-player mode as an "frantic" experience well suited to bringing in less experienced players. He also credited the game's Pokémon-collecting hook with boosting its replay value, since not every species appears on every playthrough of a given stage. An earlier hands-on preview from GameSpot's Sophia Tong described the core loop more neutrally as "a really simple game of button-mashing," noting that Pokémon are collected and swapped rather than leveled up or upgraded, and that the outlet had not been able to get a price or release date from Nintendo at the time.

== Sequels ==
On June 10, 2011, the Japanese Pokémon website announced a sequel, Pokémon Rumble Blast. The game was released in Japan on August 11, 2011, for Nintendo 3DS. In 2013, a second sequel for Wii U called Pokémon Rumble U was released. Pokémon Rumble World was released on April 8, 2015, through the Nintendo eShop as a freemium title for Nintendo 3DS. On May 22, 2019, a mobile sequel named Pokémon Rumble Rush was released globally for Android, with its iOS release happening on July 23.
