= Pokémon Rumble U =

2013 video game

- Developer: Ambrella
- Publishers: JP: The Pokémon Company; WW: Nintendo
- Director: Norio Matsumura
- Producers: Hitoshi Yamagami; Shusaku Egami; Takato Utsunomiya
- Composer: Miki Obata
- Series: Pokémon, Pokémon Rumble
- Platform: Wii U
- Release: JP: April 24, 2013; EU: August 15, 2013; NA: August 29, 2013
- Genre: Action role-playing
- Modes: Single-player, multiplayer

Pokémon Rumble U (Note: Japanese: ポケモンスクランブルU, Hepburn: Pokemon Sukuranburu U) is a 2013 action video game in the Pokémon series available on the Wii U eShop developed by Ambrella and published by The Pokémon Company and Nintendo. It is the successor to the 2011 3DS game Pokémon Rumble Blast. It features all Pokémon from the first five generations. Up to 100 Pokémon and 4 players are able to play at the same time. It is the first Wii U game to utilize the Wii U GamePad's near-field communication (NFC) function. It was released in Japan on April 24, 2013, in Europe on August 15, 2013, and in North America on August 29, 2013.

== Gameplay ==
A battle arena in Pokémon Rumble U

While Pokémon Rumble U shares similar gameplay elements with its predecessor, in Rumble U, the player controls Pokémon and battles alongside them against other Pokémon in battle arenas. A boss Pokémon must be fought at the end of every battle arena. As the player advances, new battle arenas are unlocked. Further battle arenas can be selected from a menu. Progressively, battle arena difficulties continue to rise. Once a battle arena is completed, the player is rewarded with coins and new Pokémon. The game also uses figurines, similar to Skylanders and Disney Infinity, to add content to the game.

== Plot ==
After a mishap in the Toy Pokémon Shop, some Pokémon capsules are swept down a river and washed up on a strange riverbank. Pikachu, Snivy, Tepig, and Oshawott emerge from the Pokémon capsules and set out to find their way back to the Toy Pokémon Shop. On the course of their journey, they discover Pokémon reluctant of returning to the Toy Shop. It's even found the four Pokémon were intentionally thrown into the river in the first place.

== Development ==
Prior to Pokémon Rumble U's release, Nintendo announced it would be the first game to use the near-field communication (NFC) component of the Wii U. Around the same time, Nintendo announced figurines would be distributed. Once the game went on sale in Europe, a special edition including two NFC figurines, a poster, and a code to download the game was distributed in game stores. Pokémon figurines are utilized by placing them on the NFC section of the Wii U GamePad, which allows the player to use that Pokémon in the game. NFC figurines have been sold in Japan, Europe, and the United States with limited availability. In response to the figurines not being sold in Canada, a Nintendo spokesperson commented that claiming availability in the United States was limited.

== Reception ==
Reception

Aggregate scores
Aggregator	Score
GameRankings	49%
Metacritic	49/100

Review scores
Publication	Score
Destructoid	6/10
Joystiq	2.5/5
Nintendo Life	6/10
PCMag	2/5

Pokémon Rumble U has received mostly mixed reviews. On Metacritic, the game received an aggregated score of 49 out of 100, and a user score of 5.0. Its aggregate score at GameRankings was also 49%.

Mike Manson of Nintendo Life gave a more mixed review, giving Rumble U 6 out of 10; summarising that "Pokémon Rumble U is straightforward fun that's a far cry from the main Pokémon titles, but it does pair some key strategic elements of the series with the button bashing – though there are definitely moments where there's too much going on to keep real track of, which does lead to more reliance on the latter than the former".

Chris Carter of Destructoid rated the game a 6/10. He critiqued it, finding Pokémon Rumble U too linear, lacking strategy, and repetitive and basic. Despite its flaws, he claims it may be a fun experience with friends and in short periods of gameplay.

Will Greenwald of PCMag gave the game a 2/5. He criticized it for not living up to the mechanics of Pokémon Rumble Blast and lacking a Pokémon upgrade system, due to what he deemed an unnecessary incorporation of external merchandise into gameplay. If one wants to grow attached to their Pokémon, they must buy its corresponding NFC figurine – only then will they be able to "upgrade" it to their liking. Nonetheless, he said the game is too linear and short to enjoy the upgrades.
