= Ambrella =

Japanese video game development company

Ambrella Co., Ltd.
- Native name: 有限会社アンブレラ
- Romanized name: Yūgen gaisha Anburera
- Type: Private
- Industry: Video games
- Founded: 1996; 30 years ago
- Defunct: 2020
- Fate: Disbanded and absorbed into Creatures
- Headquarters: Tokyo, Japan
- Key people: Norio Matsumura, Muneaki Ozawa
- Products: Pokémon games for Nintendo video game consoles

Ambrella Co., Ltd. (Japanese: 有限会社アンブレラ, Hepburn: Yūgen gaisha Anburera) was a Japanese video game development company that worked under a publishing agreement with Nintendo. They were best known for making spin-off games for the Pokémon video game franchise, particularly the Pokémon Rumble series. Ambrella was formerly a part of Marigul Management. In 2021 Creatures Inc acquired and dissolved Ambrella.

== Overview ==
Ambrella developed the Nintendo 64 voice recognition game, Hey You, Pikachu! in 1998, Pokémon Channel for the GameCube in 2003, and Pokémon Dash for the Nintendo DS in 2004. Ambrella developed My Pokémon Ranch for the Wii's WiiWare service, which was released in Japan on March 25, 2008, and in North America on June 9, 2008. It developed Pokémon Rumble which was released in North America on November 16, 2009.

The company developed further entries in the Pokémon Rumble series with Pokémon Rumble Blast for Nintendo 3DS, Pokémon Rumble U for the Wii U, Pokémon Rumble World for the Nintendo 3DS, and Pokémon Rumble Rush for mobile devices. The most recent Rumble games were released via the Nintendo eShop, and contain some variant of microtransactions; Pokémon Rumble World uses traditional microtransactions and Pokémon Rumble U uses NFC figurines that predate Amiibo.

On October 16, 2020, a few months after Pokémon Rumble Rush was shut down, Creatures announced the acquisition of Ambrella; Creatures received all property rights and Ambrella was disbanded, with the employees then working under Creatures.

== Games ==
List of video games developed by Ambrella
Year	Title	Genre	Platforms	Publisher
1998	Hey You, Pikachu!	Life-simulation	Nintendo 64	Nintendo
2003	Pokémon Channel	Adventure, digital pet, simulation	GameCube	Nintendo; The Pokémon Company
2004	Pokémon Dash	Racing	Nintendo DS	Nintendo; The Pokémon Company
2006	Pokémon PC Master	Edutainment	PC	The Pokémon Company
2008	My Pokémon Ranch	Digital pet	WiiWare	Nintendo; The Pokémon Company
2009	Pokémon Rumble	Action role-playing, beat'em up	WiiWare	Nintendo; The Pokémon Company
2011	Pokémon Rumble Blast	Action role-playing, beat'em up	Nintendo 3DS	Nintendo; The Pokémon Company
2013	Pokémon Rumble U	Action role-playing, beat'em up	Wii U	Nintendo; The Pokémon Company
2015	Pokémon Rumble World	Action role-playing, beat'em up	Nintendo 3DS	Nintendo; The Pokémon Company
2017	uVu - yoU versus Universe	Arcade	Mobile	Ambrella
2019	Pokémon Rumble Rush	Action role-playing, beat'em up	Android, iOS	The Pokémon Company
