= Pokémon Rumble World =

2015 action role-playing video game

- European retail version cover art
- Developer: Ambrella
- Publishers: JP: The Pokémon Company; WW: Nintendo
- Director: Norio Matsumura
- Producers: Shusaku Egami; Eisuke Kasejima; Hitoshi Yamagami
- Composer: Miki Obata
- Series: Pokémon
- Platform: Nintendo 3DS
- Release: WW: April 8, 2015
- Genre: Action role-playing
- Mode: Single-player

Pokémon Rumble World (Note: Japanese: みんなのポケモンスクランブル, Hepburn: Minna no Pokémon Sukuranburu; Everyone's Pokémon Scramble) is a 2015 action role-playing video game in the Pokémon series developed by Ambrella and published by The Pokémon Company and Nintendo for the Nintendo 3DS. It is the fourth game in the Pokémon Rumble subseries, and features toy versions of Pokémon species from the first six generations with similar gameplay to previous Rumble installments.

Originally mentioned through the Australian Classification Board, the game was officially announced during a Nintendo Direct presentation in April 2015. The game was released worldwide as a free-to-start downloadable title on the Nintendo eShop on April 8, 2015, with complete physical versions available in Japan the following November, Europe in January 2016, and North America in April 2016. The retail release of the game removed all freemium elements and provided all unlockable content from the start. The game received mixed reviews from critics, with criticisms towards its gameplay but praise towards its free-to-play model. After the closure of the 3DS eShop in March 2023, the game is no longer available for download.

== Gameplay ==
A scene of combat gameplay from Pokémon Rumble World, in which a group of toy Treecko and a Grovyle fight against each other

Pokémon Rumble World is an action game with a top-down perspective that has players assume the role of their Mii character in the Kingdom of Toys, a land populated by toy versions of Pokémon species spanning the entire series up to Generation 6 (including Mega Evolutions and Primal Reversions of Groudon and Kyogre). The gameplay is largely unchanged from preceding series installments, where players move through semi-randomized paths and fight species of Pokémon through button mashing, leading to a stage boss. At the behest of the King, who grants the chosen Mii character his toy Pikachu and a hot air balloon, the player must travel to various lands, battling and collecting new Pokémon to increase their Adventure Rank which grants them access to new items and areas.

The game uses two forms of currency, which include coins collected from stages and a new currency called Poké Diamonds. Coins can be used to unlock Mii customatization options. Poké Diamonds can be obtained either through normal gameplay, purchased directly with real money through the Nintendo eShop, or exchanged through StreetPass. A limit on real-world currency use in-game does exist, however, and players are allowed to purchase a maximum of 3,000 Poké Diamonds through this method. Afterwards, a mine will appear, granting 40 of them once per day. Additionally, the game can be played without paying for microtransactions. Poké Diamonds can be used to unlock features such as increasing the chance to find certain Pokémon, in-game travel, continuing to play a stage after a Pokémon's health has run out, or additional Pokémon storage. Challenges, which are missions with a specific set of goals, may also grant Poké Diamonds, in addition to cosmetic items such as clothing.

Rumble World differs from its predecessors in that levels are accessed via the hot air balloon system, as opposed to a world map. In total, 18 balloons, each with different themes and sublevels that have different Pokémon across each of them, can be traveled with. After using a hot air balloon, a cooldown period is enacted in which the player must wait before using it again, unless they use Poké Diamonds to reinflate the balloon quicker. The game features connectivity through StreetPass and SpotPass, in which friend Miis can appear in the main plaza or in dungeons.

== Development ==
The first mention of Pokémon Rumble World appeared as an entry on the Australian Classification Board content rating website in March 2015. The listing revealed the game to be rated PG and have online interactivity. The timing of the game's rating caused speculation that Rumble World was part of Nintendo's collaboration with DeNA to bring its properties to mobile devices. Rumble World reappeared at the end of March on the same board, revealing its developer to be Ambrella. It was officially announced by Nintendo in an April 1, 2015 edition of their Nintendo Direct broadcast, along with a worldwide release date set for the following week on the Nintendo eShop. In August the same year, an update was released for the game that added the "Lucky Balloon", taking players to a new area with a higher chance of meeting Pokémon they haven't yet caught.

On October 2, 2015, Nintendo revealed that the title would receive a physical retail release in Japan the following month, with an English retail version arriving in Europe and Australia in January 2016. In February 2016, a North American release was announced for April that same year. The retail version of Rumble World removes support for in-game purchases, and instead grants the player access to all content from the start; save data from the free version cannot be transferred to the retail release.

== Reception ==
Reception

Aggregate score
Aggregator	Score
Metacritic	58/100

Review scores
Publication	Score
Destructoid	7/10
Famitsu	8/10, 8/10, 8/10, 8/10
Nintendo Life	8/10
Digitally Downloaded	2.5/5

Pokémon Rumble World received mixed scores from critics, earning a 58 out of 100 from Metacritic. The Japanese magazine Famitsu found the game to be simple, but strong for quick play sessions. Destructoid felt that the game's freemium pay model was a step up from Pokémon Shuffle, calling it "Not bad, actually", and that it would allow players to earn in-game currency through normal gameplay without being hindered by timers or required payments. However, the title was criticized for being too simplistic, calling it "fairly shallow but very fun in spurts", and that was too short and lacked replay value. Nintendo Life rated the game positively, writing that the game offered a "genuinely generous free-play model" with an enjoyable combat and level progression system. Similarly, Neal Ronaghan of Nintendo World Report wrote that the game felt more like a "simplified sequel" to Pokémon Rumble Blast than it felt restricted by the free-to-play model. Kotaku offered more criticisms towards the game for the repetitiveness of its combat gameplay in two different articles. Writing on the game, Patricia Hernandez described the gameplay as quickly feeling like a "repetitive button-masher" that becomes a "mindless cakewalk" as the movesets of each Pokémon become more predictable. Similarly, Stephen Totilo, while praising the game for its uses of Miis and its daily quest system, considered the gameplay both "unimpressive and barely engaging".

In May 2015, Rumble World was listed as one of the top 10 'trending' games on YouTube for the month of April, being listed at number 8.
