= Pikachu =

Pokémon species

- Pokémon character
- Pikachu artwork by Ken Sugimori
- First game: Pokémon Red and Blue (1996)
- Created by: Atsuko Nishida
- Designed by: Atsuko Nishida; Koji Nishino; Ken Sugimori (finalized); James Turner (Gigantamax)
- Voiced by: Various: Ikue Ōtani; Kate Bristol (Pokémon the Movie: I Choose You!); Abby Espiritu (Pokémon: Path to the Peak); Detective Pikachu: Ryan Reynolds (film, English); Kaiji Tang (video games and short, English); Hidetoshi Nishijima (film, Japanese); Tōru Ōkawa (video game, Japanese); Koichi Yamadera (Detective Pikachu Returns and short, Japanese)

In-universe information
- Species: Pokémon
- Type: Electric

Pikachu (/ˈpiːkətʃuː/; Japanese: ピカチュウ, Hepburn: Pikachū) is a Pokémon species in Nintendo and Game Freak's Pokémon media franchise, and the franchise's mascot. First introduced in the video games Pokémon Red and Blue, it was created by Atsuko Nishida at the request of lead designer Ken Sugimori, with the design finalized by Sugimori. Since Pikachu's debut, it has appeared in multiple games including Pokémon Go and the Pokémon Trading Card Game, as well as various merchandise. While Pikachu has been primarily voiced in media by Ikue Ōtani, other actors have also voiced the character including Kate Bristol, Ryan Reynolds, Kaiji Tang, Hidetoshi Nishijima, Tōru Ōkawa, and Koichi Yamadera.

Classified as an Electric-type Pokémon, Pikachu is a large yellow mouse with a lightning bolt-shaped tail, and red sacs on its cheek which can generate large amounts of electricity. It evolves into Raichu after it is exposed to the Thunder Stone item. A pre-evolution for Pikachu, Pichu, was later added in the sequel titles Pokémon Gold and Silver.

Pikachu is widely considered to be the most popular and well-known Pokémon species, largely due to its appearance in the Pokémon anime television series as the companion of series protagonist Ash Ketchum. Pikachu has been well received by critics, with particular praise given to its cute design, and it has been regarded as an icon of both the Pokémon franchise and Japanese pop culture as a whole.

== Conception and development ==
Pikachu is a species of fictional creatures called Pokémon created for the Pokémon media franchise. Developed by Game Freak and published by Nintendo, the Japanese franchise began in 1996 with the video games Pokémon Red and Green for the Game Boy, which were later released in North America as Pokémon Red and Blue in 1998. In these games and their sequels, the player assumes the role of a Trainer whose goal is to capture and use the creatures' special abilities to combat other Pokémon. Some Pokémon can transform into stronger species through a process called evolution via various means, such as exposure to specific items. Each Pokémon has one or two elemental types, which define its advantages and disadvantages when battling other Pokémon. A major goal in each game is to complete the Pokédex, a comprehensive Pokémon encyclopedia, by capturing, evolving, and trading with other Trainers to obtain individuals from all Pokémon species.

Midway through Red and Blue's development, lead designer Ken Sugimori felt that the game needed more "cute" Pokémon and was struggling to conceive of such designs. Attributing it to his male perspective, he brought in female Game Freak staff including Atsuko Nishida to join the development team. Tasked with developing the Pikachu species and its evolutionary line, she was given specific guidelines to work with, namely its role as an Electric-type Pokémon, that it evolved twice, and that the final evolution should "look strong". Pikachu evolves into Raichu through use of the game's "Thunderstone" item. Raichu was originally planned to evolve into a Pokémon species dubbed Gorochu, but this was cut due to cartridge space concerns. Later in the franchise, Sugimori would create a Pokémon that evolved into Pikachu named Pichu to complete the trinity. Nishida developed the original Pikachu sprites using a single color identity chosen to work within the Super Game Boy's hardware limitations. Afterwards, the design was finalized by Sugimori who, towards the end of development, drew the promotional art of all the species to give them a unified look and make any last-minute changes.

=== Design ===
Standing 0.4 metres (1 ft 4 in) tall, Pikachu is a bipedal rodent with long ears and feet but short arms. It has yellow fur, long pointed ears that end in black tips, red cheek sacs, and a tail shaped after a lightning bolt. It has a striped pattern on its back, as Nishida felt since this part of the character would face the player during gameplay, it "would be better to put something there rather than having it be perfectly smooth." While preliminary designs took inspiration from mice or rabbits, as the Pokémon Rattata already existed at this point in development she instead modeled the species after squirrels. Nishida stated in an interview that she was obsessed with squirrels at the time due to their "comical" movement, and had the idea to have Pikachu store electricity in their cheeks similar to how squirrels store food. Pokémon creator Satoshi Tajiri however chose to change the species to be a type of mouse when he was designing the setting.

Nishida was helped during the creation process by fellow developer Koji Nishino, who grew fond of Pikachu as a result and consistently encouraged the design to be made cuter, something she was happy to oblige. Due to his fondness for Pikachu, he made it more difficult to find in the original games, joking he wanted to "keep it for himself". Despite initial concerns that players would not be interested in seeking out Pikachu, Sugimori showed the design to the game's development team, where the character was instantly popular. Pikachu's design with the release of Red and Blue was initially pudgier in build, but in media and games that followed was changed over time to have a slimmer waist, straighter spine, and more defined face and neck. According to Sugimori, these changes originated from the anime adaptation of the franchise where it made Pikachu easier to animate, and were adopted to the games for consistency. The older design, nicknamed "Fat Pikachu" by fans of the series, was revisited in Pokémon Sword and Shield, where Pikachu received a special in-battle "Gigantamax" form resembling its original design. This Gigantamax form was designed by James Turner, who served as art director for Sword and Shield.

=== Localization and as a mascot ===
Series director Junichi Masuda stated that Pikachu's name was one of the most difficult to create, due to an effort of wanting to make it appealing to both Japanese and American audiences. The name is derived from a combination of two Japanese onomatopoeia: ピカ (pika), a sparkling sound, and チュー (chū), a sound a mouse makes. When localizing the games for the United States, Nintendo of America's staff initially proposed to redesign "cute" Pokémon in order to appeal to an American audience. According to Pokémon Company president Tsunekazu Ishihara, they had proposed to change Pikachu to look like "something like a tiger with huge breasts. It looked like a character from the musical Cats." Taken aback, he had asked them how it was supposed to be Pikachu, and in response they pointed to the character's tail. This suggestion was scrapped, and Pikachu used the same design in the west as it did in Japan. However, Nintendo CEO Satoru Iwata recalled the events differently. At the time, Iwata was working at HAL Laboratory, and one of the localizers upon seeing the Pokémon designs stated "Something this cute can't be called a 'monster'", arguing monsters should be muscular and fearsome. As a result, the localization team drew up a muscular redesign of Pikachu for Iwata to submit to Game Freak. Iwata refused, stating his reaction was "There's no way we can show this to the people who made Pokémon."

Initially considered alongside Clefairy as lead characters for franchise merchandising, Pikachu emerged as the mascot of the anime series due to its popularity amongst schoolchildren and appeal to both boys and girls. Sugimori felt female players in particular were drawn to "cute" characters like Pikachu, stating in an interview with Famimaga 64 magazine "Some girls just collect 50 different Pikachu". The development team considered Pikachu to appeal to a larger demographic due to more closely resembling a "pet," believing that those buying merchandise would wish to have it in their home. Masakazu Kubo, a member of the anime's development team, stated that a "checklist" was involved in making the choice. He stated that their criteria required a warm design, a non-threatening color, a face that could convey emotion, a vocalization pronounceable by children, and a cute appearance, all of which Pikachu had. Pikachu was additionally selected for the role due to the fact that picking one of Pokémon Red and Blue's three starter Pokémon—Bulbasaur, Charmander, or Squirtle—would have created a "gap" with children who did not select the one used in the anime.

=== Voice ===
For the vast majority of appearances Ikue Ōtani has voiced the character since it was introduced in the Pokémon anime. Ōtani records new lines for many of Pikachu's reappearances, and stated that despite the similar dialogue "If you don't have a clear understanding of what you want to say in the scene and come up with a plan for your performance, you won't convey anything... Because, if there's the same nuance, then it would just be OK to use [previously] recorded material." In the anime series, Pikachu only speaks using its name. Initially, it was planned for Pikachu to slowly become more adept at human speech as the series progressed, but these plans were dropped during production of the series. Ōtani voices the role in all languages which is unlike other Pokémon voice actors, where the actor is different in each country's anime dub. Masuda stated Pikachu's voice was kept consistent across languages so its name would be universal across the world.

Ōtani has voiced the character in the main series video games, and also reprised the role for every installment of the fighting game crossover series Super Smash Bros.. Digitized recreations of her performance in the anime were used for Pikachu's appearance in Pokémon Yellow, and she later voiced the character from the 2013 games Pokémon X and Y until the 2022 game Pokémon Legends: Arceus. In all other appearances, Pikachu uses an in-game digitized "cry," a sound effect used to represent animal cries in the games. This cry had previously been used to represent Pikachu audibly in the main series games prior to X and Y. Other voice actors have voiced Pikachu in English. Kate Bristol briefly portrayed the role in Pokémon the Movie: I Choose You!, for a line of dialogue where Pikachu talks to Ash, with Bristol stating she attempted to emulate Ōtani's portrayal for the line. Abby Espiritu portrayed the role in the web series Pokémon: Path to the Peak. Espiritu stated that she initially assumed she was portraying Pikachu for a scratch tape before she learned she was portraying the role for the series.

== Appearances ==
=== In video games and anime ===
Pikachu has been available in all main series Pokémon video games except Pokémon Black and White and its sequel. Pikachu features prominently in the Pokémon anime series and films, which focus on the adventures of series protagonist Ash Ketchum and his Pikachu. Ash's Pikachu is initially disobedient, but after Ash saves him from a flock of Spearow, he warms up to Ash, and the pair become friends. Ash journeys to train and capture Pokémon while the members of the villainous organization Team Rocket attempt to steal Ash's Pikachu.

The game Pokémon Yellow features a Pikachu, which is given to the player as their first Pokémon. Based on Ash Ketchum's Pikachu from the Pokémon anime, it refuses to stay in its Poké Ball, and instead follows the main character around on screen. The player character can speak to it, and it displays different reactions depending on how it is treated. Pokémon Let's Go, Pikachu! and Let's Go, Eevee!, which are inspired by Yellow, have Pikachu as a starter in one of its two versions. This starter Pikachu has access to several secret techniques and exclusive moves, which are used to progress throughout the game. Seven forms of Pikachu, which wore caps belonging to Ash Ketchum across different seasons of the anime, were released in the games Pokémon Sun and Moon as well as their Ultra versions via special event distributions, with another round of distributions in Pokémon Sword and Shield additionally adding one with Ash's cap from Pokémon Journeys: The Series.

Pokémon Omega Ruby and Alpha Sapphire introduced five new forms of Pikachu, labelled "Cosplay Pikachu" which wore different outfits and could be used in in-game competitions known as "Pokémon Contests." Pokémon Sun and Moon games also introduced two Z-Crystals exclusive to Pikachu, which allow Pikachu to use special, one-time use attacks that are more powerful than standard attacks.

Outside of the main series, Pikachu stars in Hey You, Pikachu! for the Nintendo 64; the player interacts with Pikachu through a microphone, issuing commands to play various mini-games and act out situations. The game Pokémon Channel follows a similar premise of interacting with the Pikachu, though without the microphone. PokéPark Wii: Pikachu's Adventure and its sequel, PokéPark 2: Wonders Beyond, features a Pikachu as the main protagonist. The game Detective Pikachu features a talking Pikachu who becomes a detective and helps the protagonist Tim Goodman solve mysteries.

Pikachu appear in the games Pokémon Snap and its sequel, New Pokémon Snap, games where the player takes pictures of Pokémon for a score. A Pikachu is one of the sixteen starters and ten partners in the Pokémon Mystery Dungeon series. Pikachu has appeared in all five Super Smash Bros. crossover fighting games as a playable character, and in the Pokémon fighting game Pokkén Tournament, in both its normal form and as "Pikachu Libre", based on "Cosplay Pikachu" from Omega Ruby and Alpha Sapphire. Pikachu has also appeared in other games, such as Pokémon Unite, Pokémon Rumble World, Pokémon Go, and Pokémon Café Mix.

Following the anime season Pokémon Ultimate Journeys, which concludes the story of Ash and his Pikachu and retires them as main cast members, another Pikachu named "Captain Pikachu" was introduced as a major character in the follow-up series Pokémon Horizons, which featured an entirely new cast of characters. Ōtani portrayed the role of Captain Pikachu. Taito Okiura, the vice president of marketing for The Pokémon Company International, stated that Pikachu would "continue to have a significant presence in the animated series and remain an icon for the brand".

=== In other media ===
Detective Pikachu's design in the film involved finding a fine line between its normal depiction and a more realistic appearance. A skeletal and muscular system were fully modeled in order for the visual effects team to be able to articulate realistic movement.

For the 2019 live action film Detective Pikachu, the titular character was portrayed by Ryan Reynolds. Reynolds performed the character's voice work, and also did motion capture for the character's face and movements. Due to Reynolds not being on set, co-star Justice Smith would often act his scenes out to an eyeline representing Pikachu, such as a puppet or a tennis ball. Pikachu's visual appearance in the film was built as if the character was an actual animal, with the visual effects team creating detailed skeletal and muscular systems for the Pokémon. They visited zoos and consulted animal experts in order to ensure Pikachu's movements were accurate to real world animals. Pikachu initially started with rabbit-like movement, but eventually evolved movement-wise to have characteristics of multiple species, namely those of marsupials and marmosets. Its eyes were inspired by those of the sugar glider. In order to ensure the design maintained a line between realism and uncanniness, Pikachu's fur frequently changed design. The team would often bring patches of fur to filming locations to see how the colors would respond to the area's lighting. Hidetoshi Nishijima portrays Detective Pikachu's voice in the Japanese dub of the film. Pierre Tessier voices the character in the French dub of the film. Ōtani voiced the character in a brief cameo appearance. This appearance was retained in all language versions barring the German dubbing of the film, which used a slightly deeper and more out of breath version of the dialogue.

Pikachu is featured in a 2021 Katy Perry music video, "Electric". In the Pokémon Adventures manga, main character Red owns and uses a Pikachu. Other manga series, such as Electric Tale of Pikachu, and Ash & Pikachu, feature Ash Ketchum's Pikachu from the anime series. In Electric Tale of Pikachu, Ash gives him the name "Jean Luc Pikachu", a reference to Jean-Luc Picard from the Star Trek franchise.

On February 27, 2024, La Poste (France) issued a stamp commemorating Pikachu.

== Promotion and merchandise ==
As the mascot of the franchise, Pikachu has made multiple appearances in various promotional events and merchandise. In 1998, then Topeka, Kansas Mayor Joan Wagnon renamed the town "ToPikachu" for a day, and the renaming was repeated in 2018 by Mayor Michelle De La Isla with the release of the Pokémon Let's Go games. Another promotional stunt, used to promote Pokémon's debut in the United States, involved dropping 700 Pikachu plushes into a field by plane, while skydivers leapt from the planes and drove off in Pikachu themed cars. A "got milk?" advertisement featured Pikachu on April 25, 2000. A Pikachu balloon has been featured in the Macy's Thanksgiving Day Parade since 2001, with different balloon designs being introduced since. Pikachu was the subject of an internet meme, known as "Surprised Pikachu," where a screencap of Pikachu looking shocked in an episode of the anime is used as a reaction image.

Collectible cards featuring Pikachu have appeared since the initial Pokémon Trading Card Game released in October 1996, including limited edition promotional cards. One of these collectible cards was "Pikachu Illustrator", limited to about 20-40 printed in 1998, and was auctioned off for about $55,000 in 2016, and then $375,000 in 2021. Another card, sold in 2022, went for nearly a million dollars. For the franchise's 25th anniversary, The Pokémon Company announced special trading cards in 2021, each featuring 25 Pikachu drawn by 25 artists. A promotion at the Van Gogh Museum in Amsterdam featured exclusive Pokémon Cards of Pikachu wearing Van Gogh's grey felt hat. It was pulled from the exhibition due to safety concerns after scalpers mobbed the store when it came out. Several employees at the museum were suspended due to reported embezzlement of a large number of the cards. The card was later restocked in an attempt to dissuade scalpers, who had been re-selling cards at high prices. The character has also been used in promotional merchandising at fast-food chains such as McDonald's, Wendy's, and Burger King.

Pikachu and ten other Pokémon were chosen as Japan's mascots in the 2014 FIFA World Cup. ANA Boeing 747-400 (JA8962) planes have been covered with images of Pokémon including Pikachu since 1998. In 2021, the first Pokémon Jet (Boeing 747-400D) featuring entirely Pikachu debuted. As part of the intro for the first game of Major League Baseball's Tokyo Series in 2025, Pikachu entered the field wearing jerseys for the Los Angeles Dodgers. From April to June 2026, a Pikachu plush toy floated aboard the International Space Station, completing 67 days in orbit alongside astronauts such as Sophie Adenot. This was to promote World Space Week 2026, with the European Space Agency partnering with the Pokémon Company.

== Critical reception ==
Pikachu has been well received by reviewers; it was ranked as the "second best person of the year" by Time in 1999, who called it "the most beloved animated character since Hello Kitty". The magazine noted Pikachu as the "public face of a phenomenon that has spread from Nintendo's fastest selling video game to a trading-card empire", citing the franchise's profits for the year as "the reason for the ranking", behind singer Ricky Martin but ahead of author J.K. Rowling. The book Millennial Monsters: Japanese Toys and the Global Imagination stated that Pikachu greatly helped to sell the Pokémon franchise, being described as the "center of the Pokémon craze" in Japan while also emerging as a leading symbol of the series when it was released in the United States. Pikachu has consistently been considered one of the most notable and influential anime, cartoon, and video game characters since its debut. The character has been regarded as the Japanese answer to popular Disney mascot Mickey Mouse, with Polygon writer Tracey Lien noting that its ubiquity and iconic design helped endear it to audiences, allowing it to attain significant popularity. It was noted as being part of a movement of "cute capitalism". In 2024, a poll conducted by BAFTA with around 4,000 respondents named Pikachu as the twelfth most iconic video-game character of all time.

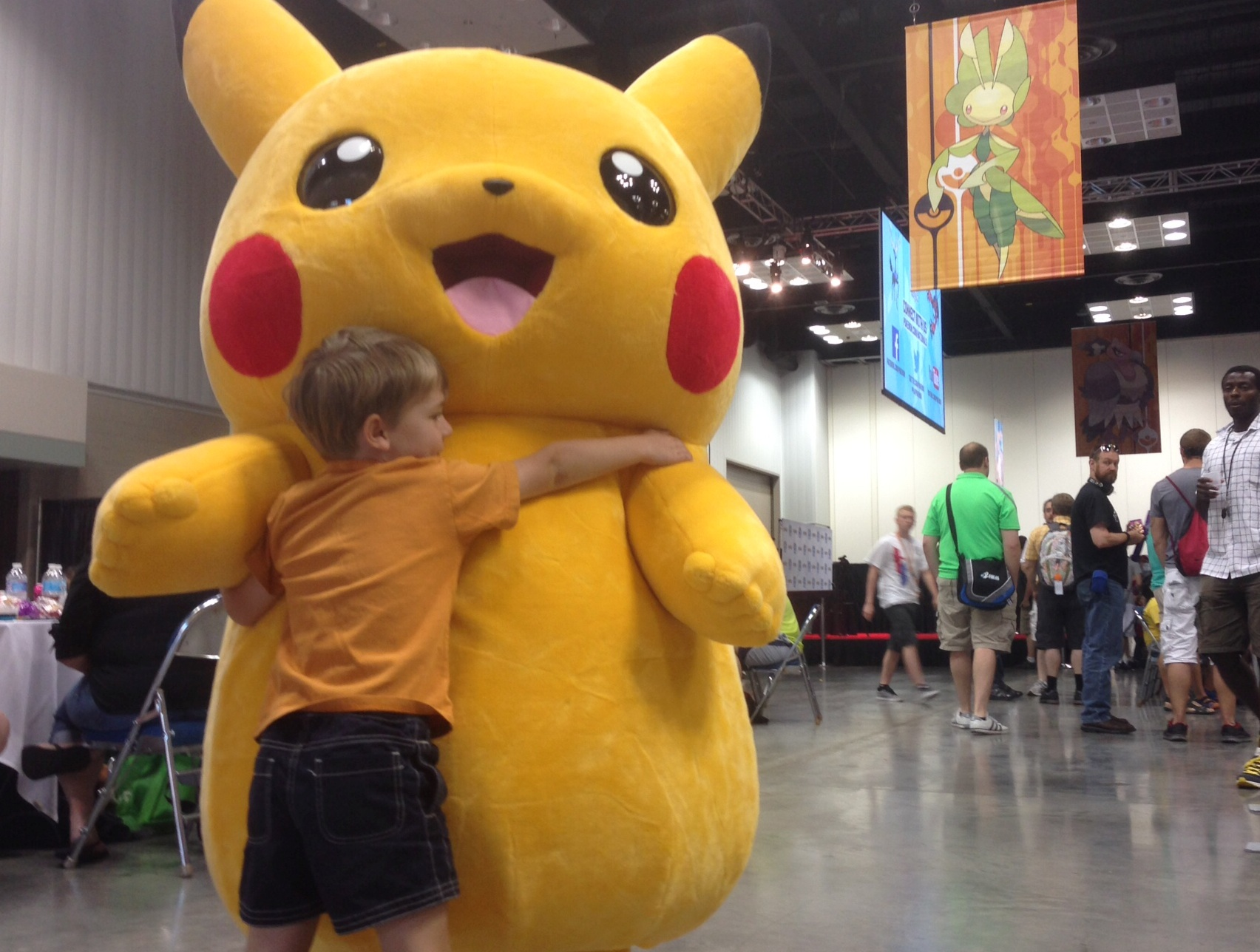
Pikachu has been a popular and enduring character since its debut, and is often described as one of the most iconic characters in the world.

Pikachu's resemblance to a cute pet was cited as making its design appealing. Its usage of the color yellow made it easy for children to recognize due to being a primary color. Additionally, the only other competing yellow mascot at the time was Winnie-the-Pooh, which helped Pikachu's popularity significantly. The color yellow in its design was noted to give Pikachu a "softness" to its design, due to the color yellow's association with words such as "sunshine," "warmth," and "happiness," with Susan Napier, a professor at Tufts University, stating that Pikachu was part of "this very interesting and adventurous world, but it's also fundamentally very re-assuring." Napier additionally noted that unlike similar popular "kawaii" mascots such as Hello Kitty, Pikachu did not lean towards a more masculine or feminine audience, leading to it becoming a more universal symbol. Pikachu's rarity in the games has been cited as part of the reason for its popularity.

Zack Zwiezen of Kotaku praised the simplicity of Pikachu's design, describing it as "possibly one of the most iconic characters on the planet" due to the design's appealing features and "instantly identifiable" design. Dale Bishir of IGN described Pikachu as the most important Pokémon that impacted the franchise's history, and further stated that "Its irresistible cuteness, merchandising power, army of clones in every generation... if your mom calls every Pokémon 'Pikachu', then you know in your heart that it is the most important Pokémon of all time." The book 100 Greatest Video Game Characters noted that Pikachu's cute design and the emphasis on friendship in its various appearances across Pokémon media helped with making Pikachu a memorable character in the minds of fans. Matthew Byrd of Den of Geek noted that due to Pikachu's rarity in the original games, it led to rumors spread via word of mouth, which contributed to a large following behind the Pokémon in conjunction with its appearance in the anime, leading to it being a well-known yet hard to find figure. Its unique design and cute appearance were also noted to have aided with its popularity.

Pikachu's role in the anime has been subject of praise and analysis. Pikachu's friendship with Ash has been analyzed for its similarities to Aristotle's values of friendship, with the reciprocal friendship between the two being highlighted due to the equality between them being the reason for their success. The anime's expansion of Pikachu's character was described by professor and author Northrop Davis as humanizing Pikachu and making the Pokémon more appealing to audiences, as it allowed Pikachu to become a three-dimensional character with multiple character traits for audiences. Pikachu's personality was described by the book Millennial Monsters: Japanese Toys and the Global Imagination as helping to emphasize not only Pikachu as a character, but also helping in making the anime series as a whole more widely popular, with the reciprocal nature of Pikachu's relationship with Ash in the vein of trainer and pet being appealing both to an older concept while still being futuristic in nature. Pikachu's departure from the anime was also met with positive responses, due to the fact that its departure alleviated concerns about how its strength would be handled as the series progressed. The hashtag "#ThankYouAshAndPikachu" trended on Twitter following the announcement of their departure.

Pikachu's voice has been analyzed for its ability to convey emotion despite only speaking one word, with children being able to determine the emotion of the character based on how the character sounds. The book Anime Impact: The Movies and Shows that Changed the World of Japanese Animation additionally analyzed how Pikachu's voice and inflections on a specific word allowed an animalistic character to be seen as a separate character and entity by the audience. It stated that it allowed them to become more familiar with Pikachu's character and grow more attached to it, allowing the audience to become properly invested with the franchise and the narrative. Meanwhile, TIME Magazine's Lisa Eadicicco felt its cute appearance coupled with the baby-like pronunciations of its own name led to it becoming an appealing design. She further stated that Pikachu's "well-written" appearance in the anime series led to Pikachu also having a strong personality, causing Pikachu to be seen not only as an object of cuteness, but also as a companion for fans. She believed its frequent appearances in promotional material for the series additionally helped to serve as an anchor for the series, with its presence helping to draw people into the wider world of the franchise.

The multiple aspects of media featuring Pikachu, including its popularization in the anime, were described as helping elevate Pikachu's appeal to a wider audience. However, Kotaku writer Patricia Hernandez criticized Pikachu's over-representation in Pokémon-related media, highlighting Pikachu's constant usage in marketing for the franchise. She stated that Pikachu's overuse detracted from other Pokémon in the series, while also criticizing the overuse for its lack of originality. She further compared it to Mimikyu—a Pokémon who mimics Pikachu in an attempt to be loved—stating that the reason for Mimikyu's popularity inherently lay in how much people were subconsciously aware of Pikachu's overuse. TheGamer's Stacey Henley cited similar sentiments, believing Pikachu's consistent presence in marketing had made it an uninteresting Pokémon and an ineffective mascot, disliking its consistent presence in games over other Pokémon.

In 2008, a ligand believed to provide better visual acuity was discovered by the Osaka Bioscience Institute Foundation and named "Pikachurin", in reference to the nimbleness of Pikachu. The name was inspired due to Pikachu's "lightning-fast moves and shocking electric effects". In 2021, the Chilean independent politician Giovanna Grandón famously went to many protests during the 2019–2021 Chilean protests dressed in an inflatable Pikachu suit. She went on to be elected as a member of the Constitutional Convention of 2021–2022, and is known as Aunt Pikachu (Tía Pikachú). In July 2021 during the Group of Seven climate summit, a group of protestors dressed as Pikachu demonstrated on Gyllyngvase Beach, Falmouth, while in November 2021, a group of activists dressed up as Pikachu to protest Japan's refusal to reduce coal consumption at COP26. In 2016, the Pikachu, also known as the Pokemonument, a fiberglass sculpture depicting Pikachu by an unknown artist, was installed in Lower Garden District, a New Orleans neighborhood. Within a few days, the sculpture was vandalized by someone with a baseball bat, but repaired. Some two weeks after its placement, the "Pokemonument" was removed, and an online statement from the artist said that the artwork would be auctioned to benefit restoration of the park's fountains.
