= Pokémon Café ReMix =

2020 video game

Pokémon Café Mix Pokémon Café ReMix
- Developer: Genius Sonority
- Publishers: Nintendo Switch: JP: The Pokémon Company; WW: Nintendo; iOS/Android; The Pokémon Company
- Director: Yoshinori Obishaku
- Producers: Akira Kinashi; Toyokazu Nonaka; Michihito Shimizu
- Designer: Manabu Yamana
- Programmer: Masayuki Kawamoto
- Artist: Hiroyuki Yamamoto
- Composer: Tsukasa Tawada
- Series: Pokémon
- Platforms: Nintendo Switch, Android, iOS
- Release: Nintendo Switch; NA: June 23, 2020; WW: June 24, 2020 Mobile; WW: June 24, 2020
- Genre: Puzzle
- Mode: Single-player

Pokémon Café ReMix (originally named Pokémon Café Mix) is a 2020 free-to-play puzzle video game developed by Genius Sonority and published by Nintendo and The Pokémon Company for the Nintendo Switch, Android and iOS. The game was released on June 23, 2020, in North America, and on June 24, 2020, in Japan, Europe and Australia.

Originally named Pokémon Cafe Mix, the game was renamed to Pokémon Cafe ReMix on October 28, 2021.

== Gameplay ==
The gameplay of Pokémon Café Mix is similar to the Disney Tsum Tsum and Yo-kai Watch: Wibble Wobble mobile games, which are games where a player connects icons together to advance missions. In the game, the player and Eevee are the owners of a café where Pokémon come and order Pokémon-related foods and drinks. With each order, the player engages in a puzzle to make the items. In these puzzles, the player needs to clear Pokémon icons on screen by linking them in a string. The goal is to collect enough of a particular item as displayed on the customer's list. Some puzzles may involve clearing extra key objects, like Cafe skills and megaphones. The player is able to level up Pokémon to develop menu items to attract more Pokémon. Staff Pokémon can help with puzzles by making them easier, for example by changing one type of icon into another. Some Pokémon are only available in points events and team events, from the delivery feature, or from legendary visit events.

For the Nintendo Switch release, the game only supports handheld mode.

Like similar free-to-play puzzle games, Pokémon Café Mix used a "life" system where a player failing a level would lose a life, and running out of lives resulted in a time delay before they could play again. Extra lives can be purchased with "golden acorns" which are earned through play, received from friends, or purchased with microtransactions. When the game relaunched as Remix, this system was changed and each attempt at a level consumed a life, whether successful or not.

== Development ==
The game was announced during the Pokémon Presents presentation on June 17, 2020. On August 18, 2021, it was announced in another Pokémon Presents that it was revamped to Pokémon Café ReMix.

The game has been receiving constant updates throughout its lifespan and continues to get them as of 2026.

== Reception ==
Reception

Aggregate scores
Aggregator	Score
Metacritic	NS: 64/100
OpenCritic	38% recommend

Review scores
Publication	Score
Destructoid	iOS: 6.5/10
Nintendo Life	NS: 7/10
Pocket Gamer	3/5
SwitchPlayer	NS: 3/5

Pokémon Café Mix received "mixed or average reviews" according to the review aggregator Metacritic. Fellow review aggregator OpenCritic assessed that the game received fair approval, being recommended by 38% of critics. It was praised by critics for its art style, deemed "adorably nostalgic" by TheGamer's Abby Espiritu, and also praised by Nintendo Life's Chris Scullion for its "easy to learn" matching mechanic. The game was mainly criticized because it was only playable with touchscreen, making Switch play uncomfortable. It was also criticized by Nathan Ellingsworth of SwitchPlayer for "an eventual sluggish pace", and gave the game a score of 3 out of 5.

The game was nominated for Best Mobile Game for The Game Awards 2020.

Destructoid rated the game a 6.5/10, stating “There is no getting around that Pokémon Café Mix is one of the sweetest looking games available on mobile platforms.”

Pocket Gamer rated the game a 3 out of 5, stating “Pokémon Café Mix is a cute puzzle game with an even cuter art style, but that adorable aesthetic can’t mask a simple, but tiring puzzler.”
