= My Pokémon Ranch =

2008 video game

- Developer: Ambrella
- Publishers: JP: The Pokémon Company; WW: Nintendo
- Composer: Miki Obata
- Series: Pokémon
- Platform: Wii (WiiWare)
- Release: JP: March 25, 2008; NA: June 9, 2008; EU: July 4, 2008; AU: July 4, 2008
- Genres: Virtual pet, Simulation
- Mode: Single-player

My Pokémon Ranch (みんなのポケモン牧場, Minna no Pokemon Bokujō; Everyone's Pokémon Ranch) is a 2008 virtual pet video game developed by Ambrella and published by The Pokémon Company for the Wii. It was released on the WiiWare service. It is a spin-off of the Pokémon series.

Internationally, this game only works with Pokémon Diamond and Pearl versions; the Japanese version was updated to receive Pokémon from Pokémon Platinum.

== Overview ==
My Pokémon Ranch screenshot

My Pokémon Ranch is similar in concept to Pokémon Box, and allows players to transfer up to 1,000 of their Pokémon (1,500 with the Platinum update) from up to eight separate Pokémon Diamond and Pearl Nintendo DS game cards, to a ranch run by Hayley, a friend of Bebe who runs the PC box system in these versions. Here, they can view their Pokémon rendered in 3D, while using their Miis to interact with them.

Players do not need to own Pokémon Diamond, Pearl or Platinum to play My Pokémon Ranch. Players with or without the Nintendo DS game will be given six starter Pokémon and a new Pokémon at the start of each day. Additionally, each day Hayley will give the player requests for certain Pokémon not in the player's Pokédex to be added to the ranch, along with instructions on where to find them in Diamond, Pearl and Platinum. It has also been confirmed that players can obtain a special Mew and Phione. Hayley can also trade certain Pokémon she already has in her possession. Eventually, adding more Pokémon to the ranch unlocks new features to the game and expands the ranch.

Similar to the actions in the Mii Channel's plaza, the Pokémon on the ranch can perform different idle actions, such as talking, playing, and sleeping at other players' ranches. Players are also able to take snapshots of their Pokémon and send them to friends registered on their Wii, as well as downloading the photos in .JPG file to an SD card, and transfer them onto your computer or camera. A simple HUD shows the ability to monitor the time and the number of Pokémon in the ranch. Apart from storing collected Pokémon on the ranch, players are otherwise unable to further train or level up their Pokémon on the ranch.

== Updates ==
On June 18, 2008, an update was made available for the game. Another update was made available on November 5, 2008, in Japan to ensure compatibility with Pokémon Platinum and to improve and add some features, such as adding an increased storage of 500 additional Pokémon, making the total amount of Pokémon 1,500 at max capacity.

=== The Pokémon ===
Most notably, as Pokémon Platinum essentially introduces seven new Pokémon in the manner of new forms of previous Pokémon and these can all be placed in Pokémon Ranch and have their forms remain while in the ranch. However, this will have some effect on Pokémon Platinum.

=== Shaymin ===
Shaymin's alternate form is activated in a different manner than Giratina's. If the player has the Gracidea item in Pokémon Platinum, the ranch will recognize it and unlock the Gracidea as a new toy in the ranch. Shaymin will normally be Land Forme, however if the player gets the Gracidea and Shaymin touches it, it will transform into its Sky Forme for the duration of the player's ranch visit. However, if the player removes Shaymin from the ranch while it is in its Sky Forme, it will revert to Land Forme.

=== Rotom ===
In Pokémon Platinum, Rotom was given five different forms. Each form represents Rotom possessing a different appliance. They will keep their form upon being transferred to Pokémon Ranch.

=== The ranch ===
Various changes have occurred for the ranch too, most notably, a 26th level of the ranch has been added, allowing you to deposit a total of 1,500 Pokémon onto the ranch. This does not give the player any extra rewards though.

=== Animations and toys ===
Also in the ranch there are twelve more animations that the Pokémon will partake in should the screen be left idle. These include water races, wrestling tournaments between the fighting Pokémon, fights between Pokémon rivals (such as Zangoose vs. Seviper, Dialga vs. Palkia, Darkrai vs. Cresselia, and so forth), and a Rotom animation utilizing all its formes.

Eleven new toys have also been added, including the aforementioned Gracidea Flower.

=== Menu options ===
With this update it is possible to change the background music from the default.

It is now possible to store up to 30 in the game. It is now also possible to copy and delete photos over to or from the SD card in bulk.

=== Club Look-see ===
There have also been some changes in regard to Club Look-see. Previously, the player could only visit NPC members' ranches after they visited and invited the player. With the Pokémon Platinum update however, the player now has the option of revisiting ranches that were previously visited, allowing the player to see their unique Miis and ranches at any time.

The number of Club Look-see members has also been increased from 37 to 40.

== Reception ==
Reception

Aggregate score
Aggregator	Score
Metacritic	47/100

Review scores
Publication	Score
IGN	4/10
Nintendo Life	4/10

Overall, the game has received negative reviews, with an aggregate rating of 46 percent at GameRankings. IGN was disappointed in the game and gave it a 4/10, believing the graphics to be ugly, citing "absolutely hideous" Pokémon models, and likening the gameplay to a screensaver, claiming it to be a largely "sit-n-stare experience." However, they had some praise for the Nintendo DS connectivity. WiiWare World, who are today known as Nintendo Life, also gave it a 4/10, calling it "half-assed" and "obtuse" and particularly noting the flawed nature of the Pokémon storage system. While they believed that it was "chock full" of missed potential, the game was still ideal for younger Pokémon fans. The UK's Official Nintendo Magazine gave the game a below-average score of 48%, finding it hard to justify the 1000 Wii Points price, and believing the game only appeals to Pokémon completists. Not all reviews were negative, however; Nintendo Power gave it a "Recommended" when they reviewed it.

== See also ==
- Pokémon Channel
- Pokémon Box
