= PokéPark 2: Wonders Beyond =

2011 video game

- North American cover art
- Developer: Creatures Inc.
- Publishers: JP: The Pokémon Company; WW: Nintendo
- Director: Katsuyoshi Irie
- Producers: Hirokazu Tanaka; Hiroyuki Jinnai; Hiroaki Tsuru; Toshio Miyahara
- Programmer: Kouichi Watanabe
- Artist: Hiroaki Ito
- Writers: Yasuki Watanabe; Misato Kadosawa
- Composers: Ayumu Ito; Takuto Kitsuta; Kenichi Koyano; Shigerou Yoshida
- Series: Pokémon
- Platform: Wii
- Release: JP: November 12, 2011; NA: February 27, 2012; EU: March 23, 2012; AU: March 29, 2012
- Genre: Action-adventure
- Modes: Single-player, multiplayer

PokéPark 2: Wonders Beyond, released in Japan as PokéPark 2: Beyond the World, (Note: Japanese: ポケパーク2 ～ビヨンド・ザ・ワールド～, Hepburn: PokePāku Tsū: Biyondo za Wārudo) is a Pokémon spin-off video game for Wii developed by Creatures Inc. and published by The Pokémon Company and Nintendo. It was released in Japan on November 12, 2011, in North America on February 27, 2012, in Europe on March 23, 2012, and in Australia on March 29, 2012.

It is the sequel to PokéPark Wii: Pikachu's Adventure. In PokéPark 2, Pikachu journeys to a new PokéPark with his best friend Piplup and must save PokéPark from the looming threat of Wish Park.

== Gameplay ==
PokéPark 2: Wonders Beyond is primarily single-player, with the exception of the attraction minigames which feature multiplayer capabilities for up to four players. The player uses one of four Pokémon available, Pikachu, Oshawott, Snivy, and Tepig, and can switch them out at will; each Pokémon has their own special abilities. Various Pokémon encountered throughout the game challenge the player in a variety of games. In chase mode, the player must tag the opponent within a time limit. In battle mode, the player must defeat their opponent in combat. Other Pokémon will sometimes offer other challenges such as quizzes or hide-and-seek. Upon defeating an opponent, they will typically befriend the player and be added to the 'Pal Pad', which lists information about all the Pokémon in the game, and will aid the player in opening the Poster Portals which serve as the entrances to Wish Park, the location of the main antagonists of the game.

== Plot ==
The game opens with the Legendary Pokémon Reshiram and Zekrom conversing about a new threat to PokéPark. They allude to a "light among the darkness" as Pikachu arrives at Seasong Beach of the Cove Area, the opening area of the game, with his friend Piplup. Pikachu and Piplup are introduced to Wish Park, a mysterious dimension accessed through portals in each region of PokéPark, and quickly realize that it is a trap designed to entrance the inhabitants of PokéPark. Oshawott arrives in an attempt to free the captive Pokémon, but he is forced to flee along with the two friends, and Piplup is taken hostage as Pikachu and Oshawott escape back to Seasong Beach.

Pikachu and Oshawott learn that in order to free entranced Pokémon, they must defeat the leaders of each "attraction" in Wish Park and ring the Wish Bells accessed through each of the four areas: the Cove Area, the Arbor Area, the Crag Area and the Tech Area. After befriending enough Pokémon to open the portal to Wish Park using their Friendship Power, the duo defeat the first Zone of Wish Park and do the same for the Arbor and Crag areas, where they team up with Snivy and Tepig respectively. However, as they progress through the park, they notice a Dark Vortex growing in the sky and realize that the evil emanating from Wish Park is causing it to grow closer to the park.

Once they defeat the attraction found through the Tech Area's portal, the four sections of Wish Park that were previously separated as four floating islands are connected, providing access to the central island which leads to Wish Palace. There, they free Piplup and confront the leader of Wish Park, Darkrai, who erases the memories of all four of the playable Pokémon and sends them back to their respective areas. Pikachu reunites with all three of his Pals with the looming threat of the Dark Vortex increasing rapidly before returning to Wish Park to defeat Darkrai. Once Darkrai is defeated, the vortex begins to consume Wish Park. Darkrai recognizes the harm that he has caused to the world and sacrifices himself to stop the vortex.

Wanting to save Darkrai, Pikachu and his Pals seek out Reshiram and Zekrom by finding their shrines located in the new Arcane Area and in Wish Palace respectively, and ask them to rescue Darkrai from the void. Then they befriend each of the legendary Pokémon by defeating them in battle. Once the two are befriended, they return Darkrai from the vortex, and he promises to remain peaceful.

== Reception ==
Reception

Aggregate scores
Aggregator	Score
GameRankings	64.92% (Note: Based on 13 reviews.)
Metacritic	60/100

Review scores
Publication	Score
IGN	6.5/10
Nintendo Life	7/10
Nintendo Power	5.5/10
Nintendo World Report	7/10
Worthplaying	6.5/10

Like the first game, PokéPark 2: Wonders Beyond was met with mixed reception. Nintendo Power gave it a 5.5/10, saying that "the gameplay is flawed" and "those looking for a deep game should lower expectations". IGN gave the game a 6.5/10, saying that "we’d all do better to hold off for the next true Pokemon title". Nintendo Life gave it a 7/10, saying that the game is "simple but it's fun".
