= Pokémon Rumble Rush =

2019 video game

- Developer: Ambrella
- Publisher: The Pokémon Company
- Director: Yoshihiro Hatta
- Producer: Yuichi Arita
- Designers: Hiroyuki Yamanaka; Shin Naka; Yoshiyuki Oku
- Programmers: Nayuta Taga; Hisato Matsumoto; NAHE
- Composer: Miki Obata
- Series: Pokémon
- Platforms: iOS, Android
- Release: Android; AU: 15 May 2019; WW: 22 May 2019; iOS; WW: 23 July 2019
- Genre: Action
- Mode: Single-player

Pokémon Rumble Rush (Note: Japanese: ポケモンスクランブルSP, Hepburn: Pokemon Sukuranburu SP; "Pokémon Scramble SP") was a free-to-play mobile game developed by Ambrella and published by The Pokémon Company. It was the fifth entry in the Pokémon Rumble series. It was available from its release in Spring 2019 until its termination on 22 July 2020. Announced on 15 May 2019, it was first released in the Australian Google Play Store. The game was later released globally on 22 May 2019 for Android and 23 July 2019 for iOS. On 15 April 2020, it was announced that the game would be shutting down on 22 July 2020.

== Gameplay ==
Like other games in the Rumble series, Rumble Rush features toy Pokémon which are controlled by the player through tap controls. The game's progression centers on moving between "islands", which consist of levels where the player's Pokémon fight against other Pokémon, completing the level by defeating a boss for that level. "Super Bosses" can be fought at the end of each island, once the player has completed certain criteria - typically, having sufficiently strong Pokémon or having certain Pokémon in their collection.

The player's Pokémon are measured with "Combat Power" (CP), and are obtained through beating the levels. Aside from Pokémon, players can obtain beneficial items known as "gears" - in form of "power gears" (which boost Pokémon stats) and "summon gears" (which summons additional friendly Pokémon in levels). Additionally, "Ores" can be randomly obtained at the end of every stage and can be refined for the user to obtain random summon gears, and power gears, and coins. There are three types of ores that are currently available: regular, unusual, and rare ores.

This is the first Pokémon mobile app that allows users to connect to their Nintendo Account, allowing various benefits such as cloud saving, My Nintendo rewards, and Mii avatar support.

== Development ==
The game was originally in development under the title Pokéland, and was revealed in May 2017. Pokéland was intended to be similar to the Rumble series, though made available for smartphones. An Android-only alpha test was held following the announcement, which covered six islands, over fifty stages and over 130 Pokémon, and ran until 9 June that year, though no further news was released by The Pokémon Company until the May 2019 release.

== Reception ==
Reception

Aggregate score
Aggregator	Score
Metacritic	42/100

Review scores
Publication	Score
Gamezebo	1/5
Jeuxvideo.com	11/20
Nintendo Life	6/10

Pokémon Rumble Rush was negatively received upon release. The iOS version of the game received a score of 42 out of 100 based on four reviews on review aggregator Metacritic, indicating generally unfavorable reviews.
