= PokéPark Wii: Pikachu's Adventure =

2009 Pokémon video game

- North American cover art
- Developer: Creatures Inc.
- Publishers: JP: The Pokémon Company; WW: Nintendo
- Director: Kenji Takahashi
- Producers: Hirokazu Tanaka; Hiroyuki Jinnai; Hiroaki Tsuru
- Programmer: Koichi Watanabe
- Writers: Misato Kadosawa; Akihito Toda; Minoru Kawahara
- Composers: Kenichi Koyano; Manami Kiyota; Shigerou Yoshida
- Series: Pokémon
- Platform: Wii
- Release: Wii: JP: December 5, 2009; EU: July 9, 2010; AU: September 23, 2010; NA: November 1, 2010; Wii U: PAL: July 16, 2015; NA: May 19, 2016
- Genre: Action-adventure
- Mode: Single-player

PokéPark Wii: Pikachu's Adventure (Note: Japanese: ポケパークWii ～ピカチュウの大冒険～, Hepburn: PokePāku Wī: Pikachū no Daibōken; lit. "PokéPark Wii: Pikachu's Great Adventure") is a spin-off video game in the Pokémon series for the Wii, developed by Creatures Inc. and published by The Pokémon Company and Nintendo. It was released on December 5, 2009, in Japan, on July 9, 2010, in Europe, on September 23, 2010, in Australia, and on November 1, 2010, in North America. It was re-released on the Wii U's eShop service in Europe and Australia on July 16, 2015.

A sequel, PokéPark 2: Wonders Beyond, was released in 2011.

== Gameplay ==
Pikachu must engage in battle with a Feraligatr in order to befriend it.

Players control Pikachu and are able to explore the PokéPark, which encompasses various zones such as the meadow and lava zones. The game's main objective revolves around clearing minigames that take the form of park attractions. By doing so, the player obtains all 14 pieces of the Sky Prism. The player can also make friends with other Pokémon through various minigames, such as playing Battle, Hide & Seek, Chase, playing Obstacle Hop, or by completing a quiz; by befriending Pokémon, new areas of the park become accessible, and the befriended Pokémon become available to be controlled in the attractions. In battle, Pikachu is able to use Thunderbolt, Dash and eventually Iron Tail; these can be upgraded to become more powerful. He can jump and perform a flip to knock an enemy into a river or lake. Some of the park's main attractions will involve Pikachu and their partner Pokémon racing against the clock to beat certain goals or deflecting rocks to earn points using the Wii Remote by waving it around and pushing buttons. Players can also take screenshots of the game and save them to an SD card or the Wii Message Board.

== Plot ==
One day, while playing with Charmander, Chikorita and Piplup, Pikachu is sent to the PokéPark, where the Mythical Pokémon Mew tells him that the Sky Prism that protects the park has been shattered into 14 pieces, all of which have gone missing. With his friends, Pikachu sets out on an adventure to find them in the PokéPark. Pikachu makes friends with other Pokémon and can use their abilities to clear various attractions in the PokéPark. After receiving all of the Sky Prism pieces, Pikachu must play a difficult game of obstacle hop with Mew, then he must battle with it and finally play a game of chase; afterward, the PokéPark returns to a peaceful state.

== Development ==
On October 10, 2009, Nintendo revealed the game with a release date of December 5, 2009, in Japan. On May 27, 2010, the game was revealed in Europe and was released on July 9, 2010. Nintendo revealed the game in America during E3 2010 and it was released on November 1, 2010.

== Reception ==
Reception

Aggregate scores
Aggregator	Score
GameRankings	64.80%
Metacritic	62/100

Review scores
Publication	Score
GameRevolution	3.5/5
GameSpot	5.5/10
GamesRadar+	3/5
IGN	7.5/10
Nintendo Life	4/10
Nintendo World Report	8/10
Nintendojo	C+
Worthplaying	7.5/10

PokéPark Wii: Pikachu's Adventure has received "mixed or average reviews". It has a Metacritic score of 62/100 and a GameRankings score of 64.80%.

IGN gave the game one of its more positive reviews of 7.5 or "good", citing some occasional control issues and a childish story as its main flaws. The Guardian gave it some praise as well, saying that the "graphics are bright and the music suitably bouncy throughout".

GameSpot gave it 5.5, criticizing an absent multiplayer and dull minigames. Nintendo Life gave it 4 out of 10, citing lacking challenge and repetitive gameplay.

== Sequel ==
On September 12, 2011, a sequel, PokéPark 2: Wonders Beyond was revealed. It was released on November 12, 2011, in Japan as PokéPark 2: BW - Beyond the World. It was released on February 27, 2012, in North America and on March 23, 2012, in Europe.
