= Pokémon Rumble Blast =

2011 video game

- North American cover art
- Developer: Ambrella
- Publishers: JP: The Pokémon Company; WW: Nintendo
- Director: Norio Matsumura
- Producers: Toshio Miyahara; Hiroaki Tsuru
- Writer: Wataru Kawashima
- Composer: Miki Obata
- Series: Pokémon, Pokémon Rumble
- Platform: Nintendo 3DS
- Release: JP: August 11, 2011; NA: October 24, 2011; EU: December 2, 2011
- Genre: Action role-playing
- Modes: Single-player, multiplayer

Pokémon Rumble Blast, known in the PAL region as Super Pokémon Rumble and in Japan as Super Pokémon Scramble (Note: Japanese: スーパーポケモンスクランブル, Hepburn: Supa Pokémon Sukuranburu), is an action role-playing video game developed by Ambrella and published by Nintendo and The Pokemon Company for the Nintendo 3DS. It is a successor to the 2009 WiiWare release Pokémon Rumble.

The game was released in Japan on August 11, 2011, in North America on October 24, 2011 and in Europe on December 2, 2011. The game was re-released as a Nintendo eShop digital download for the PAL region on November 29, 2012 and in North America on December 20, 2012.

== Gameplay ==
Pokémon Rumble Blast features similar gameplay to its predecessor Pokémon Rumble, in which the player's Pokémon explores various areas while battling enemy Pokémon. A boss Pokémon awaits at the end of each dungeon and the difficulty of each boss increases as the player progresses throughout the game. In this game there are towns in the area and each town has machines where you can buy new moves, release Pokémon when you have too many, and a fountain filled with Glowdrops that heal your Pokémon. In the game, Glowdrops are disappearing and you have to find out who took them and catch them. This game includes Toy Pokémon from the first five generations.

A Pikachu switching with an Oshawott. When switching the player is delayed.

Pokémon Rumble Blast also comes with the option to play against others wirelessly using StreetPass tagging. This allows the player to see other player's Pokémon and Miis.

== Plot ==
The play starts in Toy Town where they are introduced to the mechanics of the game and the Battle Royale. After winning the Battle Royale, Toy Town's Glowdrops have found to have been stolen. As the game progresses, the player will meet different Pokémon that will play various roles in the story. The player will also venture across various towns, each with a different atmosphere. Eventually, the Glowdrop thief (who is actually Coballion) is found, and breaks the player's wind-up key, delaying switch time. Later in the story, Coballion is encountered again at the World Axle. He reveals that he has been stealing the Glowdrops to try to fix the World Axle, which has apparently been overrun with rust as well as the Pokémon inside. As the player goes deeper into the World Axle, they realize that an entity named Dark Rust is the source of all the rust. Being protected by a force field, Dark Rust is seemingly invincible until Coballion sacrifices his key to destroy the field. After Coballion deactivates the force field, the player battles Dark Rust, and when it is defeated, the rust is removed from the World Axle and all the Pokémon previously affected by it, and all the Glowdrop Fountains in the world are restored to normalcy once again.

== Reception ==
Reception

Aggregate score
Aggregator	Score
Metacritic	56/100

Review scores
Publication	Score
IGN	6.5/10
Nintendo Power	7.5/10
Official Nintendo Magazine	68%

Pokémon Rumble Blast received mixed reviews, with an aggregate review score of 56 on Metacritic. Audrey Drake of IGN gave the game a 6.5/10, concluding her review, "As a whole, Pokémon Rumble Blast certainly has more to offer than its predecessor. With more to do, way more Pokémon to collect and far more areas to explore, the game certainly represents a step forward for the series - just not a big enough one. The unrefined graphics and bare bones presentation, paired with the already skimpy gameplay, make for a package that really should have been a 3DSWare title rather than a full release. If simple fun and the inclusion of Pokémon is all you're looking for, then Rumble Blast is the game for you." Nintendo Power gave the game's highest review score (and the only "positive" review by Metacritic standards) of 7.5/10, summarizing that the game "is a somewhat shallow experience, but the simple action and short levels make it a good pick-up-and-play portable game." The Official Nintendo Magazine gave the game a 68% saying that the game was a little too thin for a full release.
