= Pokémon Channel =

2003 video game for the GameCube

- North American cover art, featuring the Pokémon (from left to right) Pikachu, Torchic, Treecko, and Mudkip
- Developer: Ambrella
- Publishers: JP: The Pokémon Company; WW: Nintendo
- Directors: Muneaki Ozawa; Norio Matsumura
- Producers: Tatsuya Hishida; Kunimi Kawamura
- Designers: Muneaki Ozawa; Miki Obata; Norio Matsumura; Kunimi Kawamura
- Programmers: Takayuki Ito; Yosuke Suma; Nayuta Taga; Ein Terakawa; Yoshihiro Hatta; Hisato Matsumoto; Yoshiyuki Oku
- Writers: Miki Obata; Norio Matsumura; Takayuki Ito; Masayuki Miura; Hizuki Misono
- Composer: Miki Obata
- Series: Pokémon
- Platform: GameCube
- Release: JP: July 18, 2003; NA: December 1, 2003; EU: April 2, 2004
- Genres: Adventure; virtual pet; simulation
- Mode: Single-player

Pokémon Channel, released in Japan as Pokémon Channel ~Together with Pikachu!~, (Note: Japanese: ポケモンチャンネル 〜ピカチュウといっしょ!〜, Hepburn: Pokemon Channeru ~Pikachū to Issho!~) is a 2003 video game in the Pokémon series developed by Ambrella and published by The Pokémon Company and Nintendo for the GameCube. The player's goal is to help Professor Oak refine and promote his TV network through watching broadcasts with the mouse-like Pikachu. The game contains elements of the adventure, digital pet, and simulation genres. The player can explore full 3D environments, have Pikachu converse with other Pokémon, and collect various items.

The game was developed rather quickly as a sequel to the Nintendo 64 title Hey You, Pikachu! and to promote the Nintendo e-Reader accessory; it uses a novel 3D texturing effect. It was first showcased at Electronic Entertainment Expo (E3) 2003 and later through a month-long series of promotional events in Sapporo, Hokkaido, Japan. It was released on July 18, 2003, in Japan, December 1, 2003, in North America, and April 2, 2004, in Europe. In Japan, the game sold 66,373 copies in its first year. It received mixed reviews, which generally criticized its low level of interactivity and repetitive sound effects, though its collecting aspects and visuals were somewhat better received.

== Gameplay ==
Pokémon Channel is difficult to categorize into a genre, as it incorporates elements of adventure, simulation, and digital pet games. The graphics are in 3D, the perspective is first-person, and the player navigates and selects things with a cursor. The game centers on watching television programs with Pikachu, a mouse-like Pokémon (voiced by Ikue Ōtani). The player, who lives in a house, can channel-surf freely among the various channels of a television network created by the Pokémon professor, Professor Oak, as well as explore one room of the house and several outdoor areas. Pikachu sometimes displays emotional reactions while watching, such as happiness or anger. The game takes place over a few days, with unique plot events on each. The GameCube's inner clock tracks time such that every in-game day lasts at least as long as one real-time day.

While several channels are available, only a few are essential to the completion of the game. The player saves the game by reporting on recent accomplishments to Oak at Prof. Oak Report, watches episodes of an anime series at Pichu Bros., and listens to plot-advancing news coverage from Psyduck at Pokémon News Flash (PNF). On a channel called Shop 'n Squirtle, the player uses the game's currency, "Poké", to purchase bus passes to travel among the game's locations, as well as non-essential items like Pokémon dolls, new television sets in various styles, and other decorations, all delivered by Delibird (a bird-like Pokémon that carries various items in its satchel). Extraneous channels include the trivia-based game show Quiz Wobbuffet, where the player earns Poké, the art exhibition program Smeargle's Art Study, where Smeargle gives opinions on art that can be created in a paint-by-numbers style in the player's house, and the exercise program Smoochum Shape-Up.

The main collectibles available in Pokémon Channel are trading cards that display various Pokémon. The trading cards, known in game as Nice Cards, exist in three forms: Single, which simply show a picture; Motion, which are holographic; and Platinum, which are holographic and play the respective Pokémon's cries. The collectibles can be found by having Pikachu speak with other Pokémon and help them with tasks, or by ordering from Shop 'n Squirtle. There is a virtual Pokémon Mini console hidden under the player's bed that plays 10 games in the Japanese release and six games internationally. These games are all excerpts from games released for the real-life Pokémon Mini, with the exception of Snorlax's Lunch Time, which is exclusive to Pokémon Channel. The games are simple and mainly based on rhythm.

== Plot ==
Pikachu watches a game show, Quiz Wobbuffet.

A group of Magnemite delivers a television to the player's house. Upon turning the television on, Professor Oak appears to request the player's help: he is creating a new television network for Trainers and their Pokémon to enjoy together, and he wants the player to serve as a beta tester. He has them watch an episode of an anime called Pichu Brothers in Party Panic! and then introduces the game's basic features before leaving them alone. The player then hears Pokémon cries from outside, which turns out to belong to the mouse-like Pikachu, the reptilian Treecko and the avian Torchic. While the others run off, Pikachu stays and the player adopts it. Oak allows Pikachu to be a second beta tester.

After the player completes a few tasks, Oak remarks that Pikachu has behaved remarkably well. Overexcited, Pikachu inadvertently uses its Thunderbolt attack on the television. Undaunted, Oak gives the player a replacement television the next morning while remarking their viewership has brought life to the network and helped spawn new shows. The player then finds a bus stop and visits Viridian Forest, a location that first appeared in Pokémon Red and Blue. Over the next two days, Pikachu invites its friends back to the player's house, and later visits the snowy Mt. Snowfall and the tropical Cobalt Coast with the player.

On the morning of the fifth day, a disc containing the unaired fifth episode of Pichu Brothers was dropped and lost by the delivery Magnemite on their way to the show's broadcasting studio. After obtaining a lamp from a friendly Duskull in the front lawn, the player takes a bus back to Mt. Snowfall, where the disc was presumed lost. Eastward are the Ruins of Truth, where the stubborn Ghost-type Pokémon Gengar blocks the player's path until the lamp scares it away. Inside the Ruins, Pikachu gets stuck inside a statue of the bat-like Pokémon Golbat. The player hands it back to Magnemite, who is waiting sheepishly outside, and heads home to watch the last episode, along with a video called Meowth's Party.

Oak informs the player that every program produced for his network has been aired, thanking the player and Pikachu for their time, and announces the impending arrival of a gift for them. The gift, which arrives the following morning, is a "Star Projector", a device for viewing images flashed across the sky. That night, Professor Oak notices that a Pokémon has arrived at the player's house—the rare and legendary Jirachi—which leaves him in shock. The player, Pikachu, and Jirachi then visit Camp Starlight, the locale for which the Projector is intended. Using it, they project the entire series of Pichu Brothers and Meowth's Party onto the sky for the universe to see.

== Development and release ==
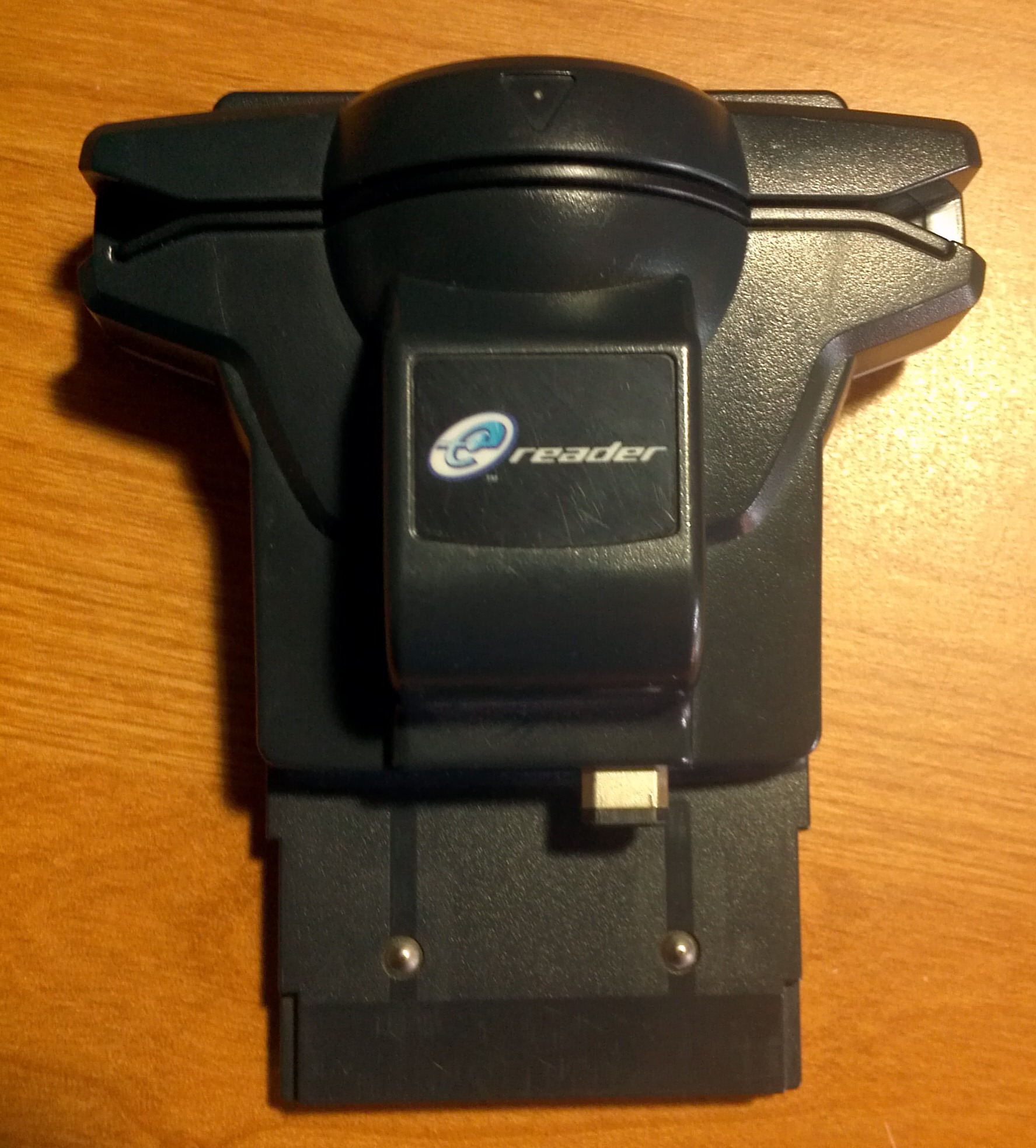
Pokémon Channel was created in part to promote the Nintendo e-Reader (pictured) and included three cards for it.

Pokémon Channel was developed by Nintendo subsidiary Ambrella and published by Nintendo and The Pokémon Company. It was created both to serve as a spiritual successor to Hey You, Pikachu!—a similar digital pet-type game wherein the player plays with a Pikachu—and to promote the Nintendo e-Reader peripheral device. The game included three e-Reader-compatible cards, but not the e-Reader device itself. When scanned, the cards upload new templates for the player to paint and for Smeargle to critique.

The game uses the visual effect of applying pre-rendered video footage to a polygon, specifically the game's pre-recorded shows on the television. IGN writer Anoop Gantayat praised this effect's implementation, although he did note some minor graphical issues visible in the transition from distanced to full-screen viewing. Also unusual for the Pokémon video game series, the Pokémon's voices are performed by the anime voice cast and sound like their names.

The game was first announced at E3 2003, where IGN staff noted that the game's demo appeared to be early in development due to its choppy frame rate. Pokémon Channel was released on July 18, 2003, in Japan, December 1, 2003, in North America, and April 2, 2004, in Europe. The game was showcased on its Japanese release date at the Sapporo, Hokkaido, location of Pokémon Fest 2003 (ポケモンフェスタ2003, Pokemon Festa 2003), a series of promotional events that extended across Japan and lasted about a month. Attendees could play the game at GameCube kiosks.

== Reception ==
Reception

Aggregate score
Aggregator	Score
Metacritic	55/100

Review scores
Publication	Score
1Up.com	C+
Famitsu	31/40
Game Informer	6.5/10
GamePro	3/5
GameSpot	5.4/10
GameSpy	1/5
IGN	5/10
Nintendo Power	7.2/10

Pokémon Channel received "mixed or average" reviews according to review aggregator Metacritic. Reviewers felt that the game would only suit existing Pokémon fans and young children: staff at 1UP.com summarized that "the various diversions here are cute, slickly produced, and entertaining, assuming you really, really dig Pokémon", and that even fans would be bored if over the age of five. Justin Leeper of Game Informer claimed that fans would enjoy it but "everyone else will be turned off, pun intended". Author Tokyo Drifter of GamePro guessed that the game had been "tailored for die-hard fans" and would please no one else. IGN's Mary Jane Irwin stated that its intuitive interface, copious instructions, and "mindless entertainment" would keep young players entertained. Nintendo Power's review called the game "hours of fun for Pokémon fans."

Reviewers complained about the game's low level of interactivity due to most of the gameplay time being spent watching television with Pikachu. Summarizing the gameplay in general as "weak", GameSpot's Ricardo Torres argued that the game's promising ideas were fundamentally deadened by "the gimmick of having to 'virtually' watch television programs" and the long stretches of time this entails. Leeper claimed that Pikachu "will be content much longer than you will" and decried the channels' non-interactive nature while praising the unlockable status of a few. Darryl Vassar of GameSpy went even further and claimed that there was "no gameplay". He gave the game only one star out of five as a result, despite calling the animation quality and Pokémon voices "decent". Tokyo Drifter found its low interactivity and slow pace to be the two biggest barriers for Pokémon fan enjoyment, and gave the game a 3.0 on a five-point scale. Irwin stated that the player would desire more interactivity and condemned the programs overall, with the exception of Pichu Bros, which she called "the only worthwhile programming". GMR felt the game was "more of a cross between a virtual pet and one of those edutainment titles from Humongous" and criticizing the game's bulk on watching television and noting that isn't very interactive. They concluded the game review with a score of 6 out of 10.

The game's 3D graphics received lukewarm opinions. Torres called them "decent but unspectacular" and "bland". His praise focused on the animations of the Pokémon with "distinct animations that suit their personalities", especially that of Pikachu. Irwin echoed these opinions. Vassar stated that the Pokémon animations were better than those in the then-upcoming GameCube title Pokémon Colosseum and found the environments passable, if boring and overly limited. Tokyo Drifter found the environments "bright and colorful" while wholeheartedly praising the smooth and "adorable" Pokémon animations.

The sound and music were negatively received. Torres focused on their repetitiveness, stating that some of the music within the programs was catchy but "it starts to grate after some of the mandatory repeated viewings you'll have to endure", and that the paucity of sound effects "puts the weight of the audio burden on the Pokémon voices, which, while accurate, are naturally repetitive". Irwin and Vassar gave special focus to the repetitiveness of the voices. Tokyo Drifter gave little opinion on the voices but found the lack of voice acting for Oak to be disappointing.

Critics praised the large number of collectible items and Pokémon in the game. Torres noted the game's many items to collect and Pokémon for Pikachu to meet, and praised the game's increased replay value as a result. Tokyo Drifter thought similarly, calling the collecting aspects "a prominent part of the gaming experience". Irwin found the collecting aspects a nice way to pass time and called the incorporation of the virtual Pokémon Mini "a nice diversion".

Within three days of its Japanese release, Pokémon Channel sold 12,581 copies, making it the thirteenth best-selling game among all platforms during its release week (July 14 to July 20). By August 17, 2003, its Japanese sales totaled 38,617 copies. The title had sold 66,373 copies in Japan by December 28 of the same year.
