= Garchomp =

Pokémon species

- Pokémon character
- Garchomp in Pokémon Diamond and Pearl
- First game: Pokémon Diamond and Pearl (2006)
- Designed by: Takao Unno
- Voiced by: Shinnosuke Ogami (Pokémon: Hisuian Snow)

In-universe information
- Species: Pokémon
- Type: Dragon and Ground

Garchomp (/ˈɡɑːrtʃɒmp/; Japanese: ガブリアス, Hepburn: Gaburias) is a Pokémon species in Nintendo and Game Freak's Pokémon media franchise, and the evolved form of the Pokémon Gabite, which evolves from Gible. First introduced in the video games Pokémon Diamond and Pearl, they have later appeared in multiple games, including Pokémon Go and the Pokémon Trading Card Game, as well as various merchandise.

Classified as a Dragon- and Ground-type Pokémon, Garchomp is a creature that combines the design of a dinosaur, European dragon, and a Hammerhead shark. In Pokemon X and Y, it was given a Mega Evolution in the form of Mega Garchomp. It received a second Mega Evolution in the form of Mega Garchomp Z, introduced in the spin-off game Pokémon Legends Z-A. Garchomp is notable for being a Pokémon in the team of the Pokémon Champion (and game final boss), Cynthia, serving as the character's "ace", or most powerful, Pokémon.

== Concept and creation ==
Garchomp is a species of fictional creatures called Pokémon created for the Pokémon media franchise. Developed by Game Freak and published by Nintendo, the Japanese franchise began in 1996 with the video games Pokémon Red and Green for the Game Boy, which were later released in North America as Pokémon Red and Blue in 1998. In these games and their sequels, the player assumes the role of a Trainer whose goal is to capture and use the creatures' special abilities to combat other Pokémon. Some Pokémon can transform into stronger species through a process called evolution via various means, such as exposure to specific items. Each Pokémon has one or two types, which define its advantages and disadvantages when battling other Pokémon. A major goal in each game is to complete the Pokédex, a comprehensive Pokémon encyclopedia, by capturing, evolving, and trading with other Trainers to obtain individuals from all Pokémon species.

Garchomp is an evolution of the Pokémon Gabite, which evolves from Gible, and was created for the video games Pokémon Diamond and Pearl. The English names of these three Pokémon resemble each other. It, as well as its earlier forms, are Dragon- and Ground-type. Garchomp was designed by Takao Unno. The beta version of Pokémon Diamond and Pearl had a different design for Garchomp, as well as its previous forms. Garchomp's design is a combination of elements from a dragon and sharks.

== Appearances ==
Garchomp first appeared in Pokémon Diamond and Pearl as one of the Pokémon that the player can feature on their team. It can be obtained either by evolving from its previous form, Gabite, which alongside its own previous form Gible is able to be caught in the wild. Other trainers can also have a Garchomp, with one of the most notable trainers to have a Garchomp being Cynthia, the Pokémon Champion of the Elite Four in Diamond and Pearl's Sinnoh region. It also appears in various re-releases of Diamond and Pearl, including Pokémon Platinum and Pokémon Brilliant Diamond and Shining Pearl. It has since appeared in other mainline games, with its most recent appearance being Pokémon Scarlet and Violet. In Pokémon X and Y, it was given a Mega Evolution form called Mega Garchomp. Garchomp received a second Mega Evolution, called Mega Garchomp Z, in the Mega Dimension DLC for Pokémon Legends ZA. In Pokémon Legends: Arceus, Garchomp is also available, including as one of the Pokémon owned by Volo, a character whose design and team were similar to Cynthia's. It has also appeared in other Pokémon games, such as Pokken Tournament, Pokémon Go, Pokémon Unite, and the Pokémon Trading Card Game.

== Reception ==
Garchomp has been well-received by fans and critics, ranking among the top 10 Pokémon in a 2020 poll of Pokémon fans. An IT Media reader poll had Garchomp ranked number one among the "600 family," a term used for Pokémon whose stats add up to 600 in value, receiving more than 30 percent of the vote. Garchomp has been described as one of the series' most popular Pokémon by Inside Games writer Sawadee Otsuka. They cited its power and association with the trainer Cynthia for why it was so popular, adding that it improved opinions on speedy Pokémon thanks to its durability. They also praised its design, saying that its combination of shark and dinosaur designs helped set it apart from previous Dragon-type Pokémon. IGN writer Dale Bashir felt it was one of the best designs introduced in Diamond and Pearl, particularly due to its purple color scheme, attributing its coolness to why it was featured in Cynthia's team. Gaming Bolt writer Pramath regarded it as one of the best Pokémon species, arguing that a large part of why people remember it so much is its use by Cynthia and the difficulty of training it. Despite being frustrated by Cynthia's Garchomp, USA Today writer Cian Maher regarded it as one of the best Dragon-type Pokémon. He noted that Garchomp was "overpowered, overused, and frankly overdesigned," citing its combination of shark, dragon, dinosaur, and jet engine design concepts, but still felt that it was among the series' most iconic Pokémon. Inside Games writer Sushi felt that Garchomp was ubiquitous to Cynthia, discussing how Garchomp's strength has been enhanced in Brilliant Diamond and Shining Pearl.

It has been a prominent Pokémon in competitive Pokémon gameplay. IGN writer Kat Bailey considered it to be among the worst new Pokémon of generation 4, feeling that its overwhelming power, speed, and Sand Veil ability made it too unbalanced. She also argued that it was the "catalyst" for other Pokémon being banned while also commenting negatively on its design. Venture Beat staff discussed how its attack and speed were so prominent that it was one of the few non-legendary Pokémon to be banned in some competitions and limited only to the Uber tier, due in particular to the fact that players were designing their teams around handling Garchomp, with Venture Beat staff noting that team compositions were more interesting and diverse after its banning. It has generally been a popular Pokémon for competitive play; despite IT Media writer Dopey noting that its usage has decreased over time, they noted it was still useful. VG247 writer Cassandra Khaw attributed its strength to multiple factors, including its well-balanced high stats, Sand Veil ability, and its type combination of Ground and Dragon. Hardcore Gamer writer Ryan Cartmel noted that despite Ground and Dragon's weakness to Ice types, its stats and Rough Skin ability made it a threat that any team had to be able to answer. He also felt that its design is quality, stating that it conveys that "it's here to mess up your day."

Due to the shared height and weight between Garchomp and baseball player Shohei Ohtani, comments were made comparing the two by fans on Twitter, with Automaton Media writer Ayuo Kawase attributing the popularity of the comparison to the ongoing World Baseball Classic at the time. Oricon News staff noted that another thing that drew comparison was Ohtani catching a 95 mile-per-hour pitch, and having a batting speed of 102 miles per hour, which contrasts Garchomp's 95 points in defense and 102 points in speed.
