= Pokémon 25th Anniversary =

Celebration of the Pokémon franchise

- Date: January 1 – December 31, 2021
- Type: Anniversary event
- Motive: Celebration of the 25th anniversary of the 1996 Japanese release of Pocket Monsters Red and Green for the Game Boy, the first games in the Pokémon franchise
- Organized by: The Pokémon Company
- Website: 25.pokemon.com/en-us/

The Pokémon 25th anniversary (Japanese: ポケモン 25周年, Hepburn: Pokemon 25 Shūnen), officially branded as Pokémon25, was a celebration held throughout 2021 in commemoration of the twenty-fifth anniversary of the Pokémon franchise, which began with the original Japanese release of Pocket Monsters Red and Green for the Game Boy on February 27, 1996. The franchise was celebrated through various media of the franchise including video games, the anime, the manga, toys, clothing, music and events.

The anniversary saw the announcements of Pokémon Brilliant Diamond and Shining Pearl, which both released on November 19, 2021, and Pokémon Legends: Arceus, which released on January 28, 2022. They are remakes and a prequel, respectively, of the 2006 games Pokémon Diamond and Pearl on the Nintendo Switch.

== Timeline ==
The first official mention of the anniversary celebration was on November 26, 2020, at the Macy's Thanksgiving Day Parade. The Pokémon Company presented the logo for the anniversary in front of a giant balloon of Pikachu, who has made a regular appearance at the parade since 2001. This was followed by news that Pokémon would be collaborating with Japanese Space Exploration Agency, JAXA to celebrate the new year. The collaboration involved seeing Pokémon in augmented reality aboard the International Space Station.

- January 13: news revealed about the celebration, involving that American singer Katy Perry was collaborating with Pokémon on a new music program for its 25th anniversary. This was done via a video released on The Pokémon Company International's official YouTube channel, featuring a Rube Goldberg machine travelling through the history of the franchise.
- January 14: The Pokémon Company announced that New Pokémon Snap would be released worldwide on April 30, 2021.
- February 9: McDonald's released an exclusive collection of Pokémon Trading Cards from the official TCG that were included in McDonald's Happy Meals for a limited time. 25 cards were available to collect with 50 total (25 non-holo and 25 holo).
- February 15: Pokémon collaborated with Levi Strauss & Co., launching the '90s-inspired Levi's x Pokémon collection to celebrate the anniversary.
- February 19: Pokémon Day website in Japan launched which displayed live results of a Twitter hashtag-based fan vote that ran from February 19 to 22, for favorite Pokémon, with final results to be revealed afterward. The website includes Pokémon trivia and information on each generation. February 19 also began Pokémon's official 8 day countdown to Pokémon Day (with each of the eight days representing the eight generations of starter Pokémon) on their social media accounts.
- February 25: a special Pikachu knowing the move Sing (a move it normally can't learn) will be distributed to the Pokémon Sword and Shield games to tie in with the Pokémon 25th anniversary musical motif.
- February 27, Pokémon Day (Japan & Korea) / 26 (international): a Pokémon Presents presentation occurred. It showed new information about New Pokémon Snap and Pokémon Brilliant Diamond and Shining Pearl and Pokémon Legends: Arceus were announced.
- February 27, Pokémon Day: the Pokémon 25th Virtual Concert featuring American rapper Post Malone was held as part of the P25 Music Program that was first announced on February 11. Four songs were featured: Psycho, Circles, Only Wanna Be with You and Congratulations.
- February 27, Pokémon Day: For a very limited time, 25th Anniversary Pokémon TCG three-card booster packs were included inside select General Mills cereals. There are a total of 14 exclusive cards to collect.
- March: Galar Month celebration on the Pokémon official international social media accounts
- April: Alola Month celebration on the Pokémon official international social media accounts
- April 30: New Pokémon Snap released worldwide for the Nintendo Switch
- May: Kalos Month celebration on the Pokémon official international social media accounts
- May 6: The 24th English dub season of the Pokémon anime Pokémon Master Journeys: The Series is revealed
- May 14: "Electric" by Katy Perry, the lead single of Pokémon 25: The Album, is released
- June: Unova Month celebration on the Pokémon official international social media accounts
- June 12: 24th English dub anime season, Pokémon Master Journeys: The Series, season premiere in Canada
- July 16: The Pokémon Company partners with American snacks manufacturer Nabisco for special edition boxes of mini-branded Oreos, Chips Ahoy!, and Nilla cookies. There are 3 boxes total with each box showcasing the game's starter line of Fire, Water, and Grass Pokémon.
- July: Sinnoh Month celebration on the Pokémon official international social media accounts
- July 21: Pokémon Unite, a spinoff MOBA, released for Nintendo Switch
- July 6: 5th anniversary of Pokémon GO, mobile game
- July 16: "Take It Home" by Mabel, another single from Pokémon 25: The Album, is released.
- August 6: Vince Staples, Cyn and Zhu were announced as part of Pokémon 25: The Album, where the former two perform the songs "Got 'Em" and "Wonderful" respectively. Alongside that, the Red EP was released. The EP failed to chart.
- August 18: Another Pokémon Presents presentation took place. It gave updates on the Diamond and Pearl remakes as well as the prequel.
- August 20: The Blue EP is released, including remixes by Zhu. The EP failed to chart.
- August: Hoenn Month celebration on the Pokémon official international social media accounts
- September: Johto Month celebration on the Pokémon official international social media accounts
- September 1: "Game Girl" by French artist Louane for Pokémon 25: The Album is released.
- September 9: Pokémon Evolutions, a web anime series celebrating the 25th anniversary, aired on YouTube and Pokémon TV
- September 13: Limited edition Pokémon Oreo packaged cookies were made available. Each cookie featured 1 out of 16 different Pokémon. A Walmart exclusive 12 pack box of mini Oreos was also released.
- September 22: Pokémon Unite, a spinoff MOBA mobile game, mobile release for iOS and Android
- October: Kanto Month celebration on the Pokémon official international social media accounts
- October: New Pokémon cards will be released as part of the celebration.
- October 15: Release of Pokémon 25: The Album, featuring Post Malone, Katy Perry, Vince Staples, Cyn, Zhu, Mabel, Louane, Tierra Whack, Lil Yachty, Jax Jones, and J Balvin. The album did not chart on the Billboard 200.
- November 19: Pokémon Brilliant Diamond and Shining Pearl worldwide release date for the Nintendo Switch.

== Pokémon 25th Anniversary Region Exhibit ==
From March (the full month right after Pokémon Day), each region of the Pokémon world had been celebrated by the official Pokémon international social media accounts. During each month, an online exhibit had been opened on the official Pokémon website. All the regions are arranged in generation reverse order.

Pokémon 25th Anniversary Region Exhibit
Month	Region
March	Galar
April	Alola
May	Kalos
June	Unova
July	Sinnoh
August	Hoenn
September	Johto
October	Kanto
