= New Pokémon Snap =

2021 video game

- Home menu icon
- Developer: Bandai Namco Studios
- Publishers: JP: The Pokémon Company; WW: Nintendo
- Director: Haruki Suzaki
- Producers: Toyokazu Nonaka; Akira Kinashi; Takato Utsunomiya; Kazunori Sugiura
- Designer: Yasuhito Kobayashi
- Programmer: Sei Nakatani
- Artists: Tomo Moriya; Makoto Watarai; Hidekazu Shirai
- Composers: Hiroki Hashimoto; Katsuhiko Iwama
- Series: Pokémon
- Platform: Nintendo Switch
- Release: WW: April 30, 2021; CHN: July 16, 2024
- Genre: Photography
- Mode: Single-player

New Pokémon Snap (Note: New Pokémon Snap (Japanese: New ポケモンスナップ, Hepburn: Nyū Pokemon Sunappu)) is a 2021 photography video game developed by Bandai Namco Studios and published by Nintendo and The Pokémon Company for the Nintendo Switch. It is a sequel to HAL Laboratory's 1999 Nintendo 64 game Pokémon Snap. It was announced in June 2020 during a Pokémon Presents livestream and was released on April 30, 2021, during the franchise's 25th anniversary. Players are invited to join Professor Mirror's research team to explore the archipelagic Lental region in an automated hovercraft and photograph Pokémon in order to conduct research about their ecology as well as certain phenomena occurring in the region.

Gameplay in New Pokémon Snap is similar to its Nintendo 64 predecessor; courses consist of on-rails photography sessions where players try to take high-quality photos of Pokémon. As the game progresses, players will unlock new courses to explore as well as items that help with taking better photos. Additionally, courses can be levelled up, allowing different Pokémon and interactions to occur. New Pokémon Snap introduces night-time courses, boss battles and a new photo rating system to indicate how rare a species' behavior is. The professor's lab serves as the game's hub for accessing courses and acts as a space for players to review their research on wild Pokémon and their habitats, manage their photo album, customize their account, and interact with online features.

Discussion of a sequel to Snap occurred over multiple years for different consoles until Bandai Namco Studios were given the opportunity to develop the game due to the development of Pokkén Tournament, which they also worked on. The development team wanted the game to focus on being a world where wild Pokémon live and selected its roster of species based on their natural habitat and characteristics. New Snap's developer Haruki Suzaki said that the game built upon concepts already present in the first game and expanded on them to sell them to a modern audience due to the presences of social media. Development of the game aimed to take full advantage of the Nintendo Switch's capabilities. During and after its release, the game was used in collaboration with companies such as Fujifilm and Seven-Eleven Japan. In August 2021, the game received downloadable content (DLC) in the form of a free content update, adding new Pokémon species and courses to the game.

New Pokémon Snap was well received by critics, who considered it an improvement over the original. Critics positively highlighted the games' graphics, level of detail, photo editor, and relaxing atmosphere. Other critics were more mixed towards the game's gameplay, which many felt was repetitive, while others expressed disappointment regarding the game's photo rating system and a lack of the evolution mechanic present in the original game. It was similarly received well among fans, with the game leading to some Pokémon increasing in popularity within the fandom. Critics have referred to New Pokémon Snap as one of the best games of 2021 and was nominated at The Game Awards 2021 and the 2021 Golden Joystick Awards. As of March 2022, the game has sold over 2.4 million copies.

== Gameplay ==
The player photographs Pokémon in their natural habitats to build a "Photodex", using fruit to lure them closer. This Meganium is under the effect of the Illumina phenomenon, and acts as one of the game's few "boss battles".

New Pokémon Snap is a three-dimensional (3D) photography video game with elements of the rail shooter and puzzle genres. The player controls a Pokémon photographer who is tasked by a research team led by Professor Mirror with taking pictures of Pokémon species in their natural habitat in the Lental region for their ecological survey. Additionally, the player is asked to investigate Illumina phenomenon, where Pokémon and plants known as crystablooms exhibit a strange luminescence. The region consists of six main islands that are divided into multiple areas representing biomes such as jungles, deserts, reefs and caves. The player explores these areas through designated courses, with certain courses being visited more than once but at different times of the day, a new feature to this game. These different versions are typically set at night, and can feature species and routes that cannot be seen in the daytime courses. On each expedition, the player rides in a pod-shaped multi-terrain hovering transportation vehicle, known as the NEO-ONE, that automatically follows along a linear pre-set pathway steadily. The NEO-ONE allows the player to take photos of the courses safety and rotate 360 degrees; the D-pad buttons can be used to immediately see behind the player. The player can also unlock a function that allows them to speed up the NEO-ONE on a given course. To control the camera, players can choose to use either the analog stick or gyro controls. In each expedition, the player is limited to 72 photos. Upon finishing the course, the NEO-ONE teleports back to Professor Mirror's lab, which acts as the game's hub. The lab, alongside the Research Camp outside it, also function as one of the game's courses.

The game originally featured 214 Pokémon species, increased to 234 species in the 2.0.0 update, from the first eight generations of the mainline Pokémon series. Taking photographs of each species adds their information to a compendium called a Photodex, where each photo the player takes is graded by Professor Mirror on a scale of one to four stars based on how rare the current activity of the Pokémon is. Photos are also given a score taking into account factors like shot composition, how close the Pokémon is, and whether they are facing the camera or not. Depending on the score, the photo would be awarded a bronze, silver, gold or platinum rating. As the player takes higher-quality photos, they earn Expedition Points that go toward improving the Research Level of each area in the Lental region. Achieving higher research levels will open up more levels to explore in that courses, allowing for new species to appear or for already existing Pokémon to exhibit new behavior. After Professor Mirror grades the player's photographs, players can retouch their photos using the Re-Snap feature. This allows the player to change the photo's parameters like zoom, brightness, and blur, as well as add photographic filters, photo frames, and stickers. These edited photos can be saved to a personal photo album separate from the Photodex. Players can upload their photos online to share with other players using the Nintendo Switch Online service, who in turn can help get their favorite photos be featured in-game by liking them, known as giving Sweet! Medals. Another system, known as the LenTalk, allows the player to take on tasks requested by the research team. By completing various tasks in a given course such as through exploring or by photographing specific actions of a Pokémon, the player can also unlock research titles that can be added to their in-game profile. The tasks also act as hints on how to achieve rarer three- and four-star photos.

To get better pictures, the player can unlock tools throughout the game and are encouraged to use them to coax out rarely-seen Pokémon reactions on camera. To lure out Pokémon or get their attention, players can use an apple-like fruit called a fluffruit. By taking a photo of a crystabloom flower, the player can unlock the Illumina orb item. Throwing an orb at a Pokémon will cause them to exhibit temporary effects of the Illumina phenomena by glowing; the orbs also serve to not only help the player take pictures at night, but also potentially change a Pokémon's behavior. Depending on the Pokémon, the Illumina orb can cause them display different actions such as help waking them sleeping, or even sometimes cheering them up. Activating crystablooms that are nearby Pokémon with the orbs can also have the same effect. Each island has their own orbs. Similar, the player can activate a music box that causes nearby Pokémon to dance. The player's camera can also act as a scanner, whereby they can identify points of interest hidden Pokémon as well as identify objects in the surrounding area. Certain areas of scenery can be scanned in order to unlock an alternate path, causing the NEO-ONE to divert on the new path and follow it to a new area.

At the end of each island, the player is sent on a research expedition to investigate the island's Illumina Spot, which are home to a large vibrantly-glowing Pokémon known as an Illumina Pokémon, which act as the island's guardian. These encounters act as a sort of boss battle, whereby the player needs to use fluffruit and Illumina orbs in-order to be able to get it pose and take hiqher-quality photos of them.

== Plot ==
=== Characters ===
Unlike the first Snap game, the player controls an avatar rather than a named character. At the beginning of the game, players can choose their character's gender as well as hair and skin colors through eight pre-sets. The avatar can not be changed after being created. While never officially named in-game, in English promotional material the male and female avatars are referred to as Jaime and River respectively.

Some of New Pokémon Snap's cutscenes features full voice acting for all of it characters, a first for the Pokémon series, although others limit this to just short voice lines. Voices between the English and Japanese dubs can be toggled between. The player can deactivate the voice acting in the game's settings.

Professor Mirror, known in Japanese as Prof. Kagami (カガミ博士, Kagami hakase), is a local Pokémon expert of the Lental region who runs the Laboratory of Ecological and Natural Sciences; he leads a research team on an ecological survey of the region for the first time in 100 years. Mirror has been invested in investigating the region since his childhood and has since devoted his life to studying the Pokémon and phenomena of the Lental region. He acts in a similar role to Professor Oak in the first game; he grades the player's photos, he is an inventor of devices such as the NEO-ONE and acts as a mentor to his young assistants. In Japanese he is voiced by Ryōtarō Okiayu and by Ben Lepley in English.

Rita (リタ) is the professor's main assistant, she helps guide the player with their work. Her design slightly resembles the Pokémon Goodra. In Japanese she is voiced by Manami Numakura and by Anairis Quiñones in English. Phil, known as Phill (フィル, Firu) in Japanese, acts as the player's rival who competes against you with assisting with Mirror's research; he typically takes his job rather seriously. He is voiced by Makoto Koichi in the Japanese dub and by Erica Mendez in the English dub. Todd Snap, known in Japanese as Toru (トオル, Tōru), was the protagonist from the first game and returns as one of Mirror's assistants who gives the player photography tips. He is now an adult and became a famous photographer due to the photos he took in the first Snap game, particularly of the Mythical Pokémon Mew. Todd Snap also worked with the professor on the creation of the NEO-ONE, even naming it after the vehicle he used in Pokémon Snap, the ZERO-ONE. Kappei Yamaguchi voices him in the Japanese dub and Griffin Burns voices him in the English dub.

=== Story ===
The player, a Pokémon photographer, travels to the Laboratory of Ecological and Natural Sciences (L.E.N.S.) in the Lental region after being invited by Professor Mirror and his assistant Rita to help with their research studies and ecological survey. The pair are researching the Illumina phenomenon, a phenomenon that causes Pokémon species as well as specific flowers to exhibit a strange luminescence, which was documented in a travelogue by an explorer 100 years prior. First meeting up at lab on Floria Island, the professor sends the player to the island's nature park multiple times at different times of the day to take photos and observe Pokémon species in their natural habitats, as well as investigate the area for the Illumina phenomenon. The professor later detects strong energy readings near the end of the nature park, which the player follows to find a large illuminated Meganium, becoming the first Pokémon to have been seen exhibiting the Illumina phenomenon in a century. Upon returning from the encounter, the professor notes that the travelogue details three other species with the Illumina phenomenon that had last been seen on other islands in the region and he asks the player to explore the other islands and document the Illumina Pokémon.

Across three of the Lental region's archipelago, Belusylva Island, Maricopia Islands and Voluca Island, the player travels through different biomes and unlocks tools that can change a Pokémon's behavior to further the documentation of different species. During this time, two more of Professor Mirror's assistants, Todd Snap and Phil, arrive at L.E.N.S. to aid in the professor's work. Mirror also develops the Illumina orbs, tools that can cause Pokémon to temporarily appear in the Illumina state. The player eventually finds the Illumina Pokémon on each of the three islands, represented by a Milotic, Wishiwashi and a pair of Volcarona respectively. Despite this, Mirror reports that there are energy readings on an island not mention in the travelogue, Durice Island. Investigating the island, the player tracks the readings to a cave housing another Illumina Pokémon, a large Steelix.

At the end of the cave, the player discovers a large mural among ancient ruins; the mural itself depicts five Illumina Pokémon protecting the region from a large meteorite 2,000 years ago. However, in the middle of the five Pokémon, an unknown sixth Illumina Pokémon is depicted. Returning to Professor Mirror, he acknowledged the mural matched rumors about the region and hypothesised that the meteorite had eventually hit the region and was responsible for the Illumina phenomenon. He sends the player to investigate the Ruins of Remembrance on the small Aurus Island to discover the history of the Lental region. At the end of the ruins, the legendary Pokémon Xerneas appears to the player as the final Illumina Pokémon. Whilst taking pictures of the Pokémon, it is revealed that Xerneas is the actual source of the Illumina phenomenon in addition to being the first to exhibit it. Finally returning to back to L.E.N.S., Professor Mirror questioned why the Illumina Pokémon appeared to the player, with the assistants believing that it was the player's love for Pokémon was why they appeared.

== Development ==
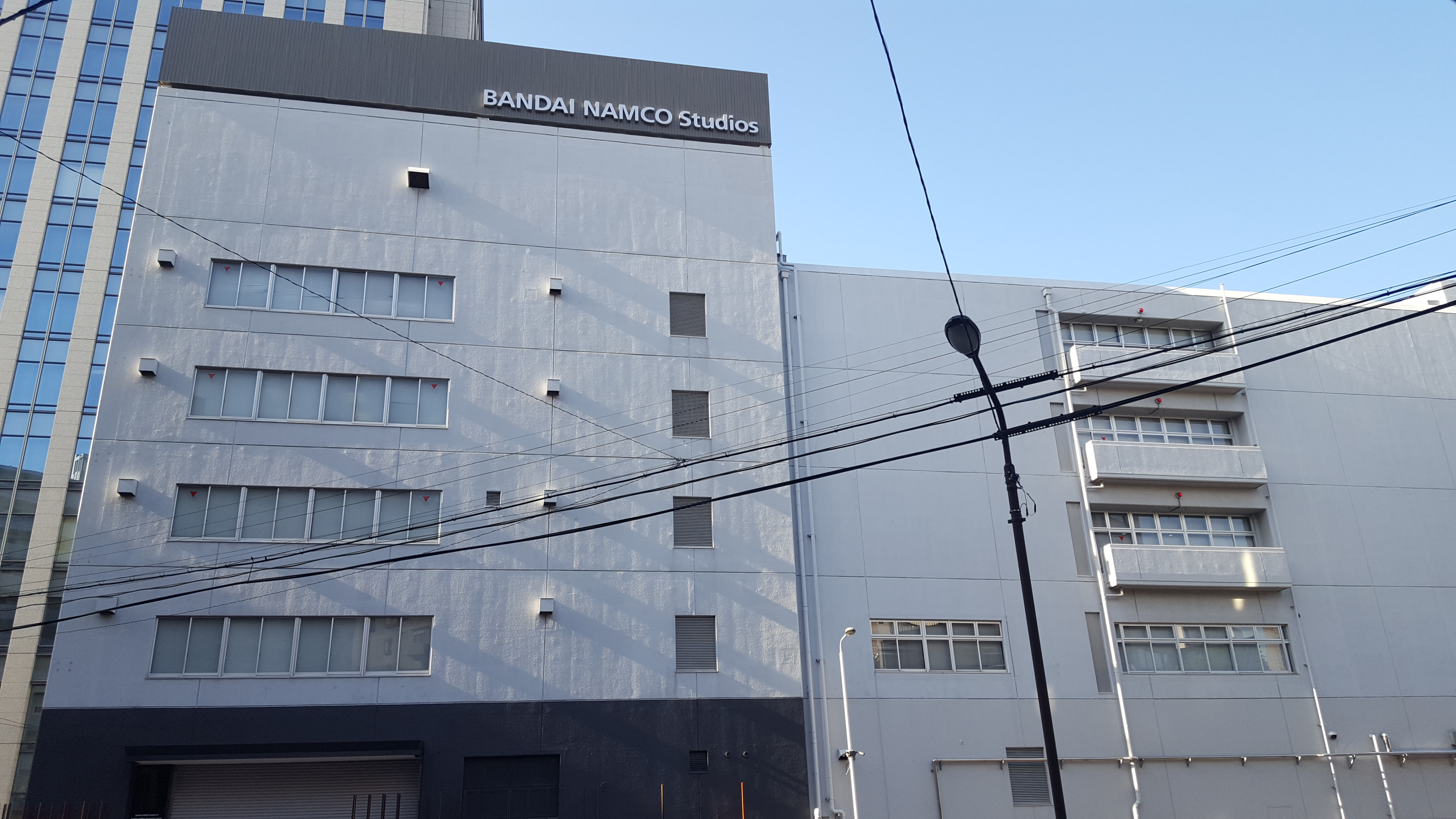
Bandai Namco Studios' headquarters in Kōtō, Tokyo

New Pokémon Snap was developed by Bandai Namco Studios, with the game being published by The Pokémon Company in Japan and by Nintendo everywhere else. Japanese game designer Haruki Suzaki served as the game's director, who had previously directed multiple Bandai Namco fighting games including Tekken 5: Dark Resurrection, Soul Calibur V, and Pokkén Tournament. The Pokémon Company's CEO Tsunekazu Ishihara serves as one of the game's executive producer, a role he has held for all projects of the Pokémon franchise. Other producers also include Toyokazu Nonaka, Akira Kinashi, Takato Utsunomiya and Kazunori Sugiura. Snap's lead designers include Yasuhito Kobayashi, programmer Sei Nakatani, and artists Tomoko Moriya, Makoto Watarai and Hidekazu Shirai. The lead composers and sound designers were Katsuhiko Iwama and Hiroki Hashimoto.

Prior to the development of New Pokémon Snap, the prospects of a sequel to Pokémon Snap being made had been discussed over multiple years. Tsunekazu Ishihara and Haruki Suzaki both stated in an interview with Famitsu that a sequel had always been discussed every new console generation, such as with the GameCube and Wii, but mentioned that development on a project was difficult to start up due to debates about how the game's gimmick would work and believed that "taking photos has become something we do every day and its novelty isn't what it once was, so it was a difficult concept to design a game around." During an interview with Polygon in 2012, series director and producer Junichi Masuda was asked about a Snap game for the Wii U that took advantage of the Wii U GamePad, to which he dismissed the idea. Comparing the idea of a new game from the original Pokémon Snap, Masuda stated that while "photography wasn't as widely spread in those days" releasing a new Snap would not be as interesting without a new idea as "everyone has a camera and can take photos whenever they want". The following year, Masuda was asked a similar question about a Wii U version by Nintendo World Report. In response, he commented that "at the Pokémon brand we're always challenging ourselves to try new things, to come up with new ways to surprise our fans and come up with new ways to play the game", insisting that a similar experience to the original on the Wii U would not be enough and that only when they have new ideas for the concept is when they would announce a new game. He made similar comments to Polygon the same month, with additional comments rejecting a similar experience on the Nintendo 3DS as well.

Masuda would continue to get asked in 2014 in interviews with both Kotaku UK and Computer and Video Games, where he would acknowledge the amount of requests for a new game and appreciated fans' admiration for Snap, admitting that he would like to see a "cool new version of Pokémon Snap" as a player but believed that a remake with just better graphics would not be interesting; he added though that The Pokémon Company would not stop a new game from coming out and acknowledged that a direct port of the original would be "kind of neat as well". The original Snap would eventually be ported to the Wii U via the Virtual Console service, first releasing in Japan and Europe in April and August 2016 respectively, and later in January 2017 in North America. When asked by GameCentral in 2019 why there was not a "Pokémon Snap 2" on the Wii U or a part of the Nintendo Labo VR Kit, both Masuda and game designer Shigeru Ohmori laughed at the questioning, with Masuda reiterating that a sequel would need a "very unique twist" in order for it to be made. Snap's influence has also been seen in other Pokémon games. During an interview with Game Informer in 2016, Ohmori, director of Pokémon Sun and Moon, compared the games' Poke-Finder mode to Snap and believed fans would enjoy photography return in a Pokémon game. Critics also believe Pokémon Go to be a spiritual successor to Snap due to its real-world photography mechanic, with IGN writer Terri Schwartz elaborating that it was "a smart progression of Pokémon Snap's legacy." Additionally, Schwartz lamented the lack of a new game on the Wii U, calling it "a huge mistake that Nintendo wouldn't try to capitalize on the Wii U's technology".

"After we selected appropriate climates, environments, and Pokémon we designed the details of courses that players will research. To create a world where you can take beautiful photos of Pokémon in their world, some Pokémon behaviours are designed to make the most use of the characters in the backgrounds, and some levels have been designed to show the relationships directly between Pokémon."

— Director Haruki Suzaki discussing Pokémon selection and environment creation, 2021 GameCentral interview

Development of New Pokémon Snap began around the end of Pokkén Tournament DX's DLC cycle in 2018 and took just under 3 years to fully develop. According to Suzaki in an interview with IGN, Bandai Namco Studios earned the opportunity to develop the game because of their work on Pokkén Tournament. He elaborated that Pokkén incorporated worldbuilding into the background of the game by depicting Pokémon interacting with the world and cohabitating with people, with Ishihara even praising the team for the level of attention to detail in the backgrounds. Suzaki stated that this experience of showcasing naturally living Pokémon was got the developers to collaborate with The Pokémon Company again. However, Suzaki mentioned the main focus of Snap was to "build the world where wild Pokémon actually live" rather than just in the background of arenas. The developers began creating the world by thinking about the environment Pokémon species would live and create detail scenery whilst fully utilizing the Nintendo Switch's capabilities. Throughout the development, the team aimed to make "Pokémon the star of the game" by making them move naturally in their environments, with the goal that this would make the Pokémon fun to watch and take pictures of.

When designing the environments, as well as the overall pacing of the game, Suzaki had in mind for them to be modelled like a theme park ride so that players would repeatedly play them to fill out their Photodex. Within the environments, Pokémon are allowed to freely roam around and was designed to balance with the replayable game elements. Over the course of development, the development team created different interactions and movements based on various scenarios in order to demonstrate a Pokémon's relationship with its environment, itself and other species. These behaviors were based on the species' nature, their appearances in other games and the behavior and characteristics of similar real-world animal lineage. These ideas would then be presented and reviewed by The Pokémon Company and Game Freak to make sure they matched the characteristics of the given species. One of the big decisions made during development was decided what Pokémon should be represented in the game, which was "truly hard" according to Suzaki as compared to the original Snap featuring 63 of the total 151 species available at the time, there were nearly 900 species to choose from during New Snap's development. To help guide the development team with this decision, they imagined a Pokémon's natural habitats and ecosystems in order to research them, before then narrowing down the roster by considering how a Pokémon would live and act in its environment, ending up with a final roster of over 200. Using the Pokémon species Quagsire as an example, he explained that while he wanted to add it based on its chilled nature, it was only added to the game because of the opinions of multiple people. He also added that during development, he grew fond of the Pokémon Bidoof. One Pokémon species, Shroomish, was originally cut from the final game despite appearing in the game's reveal trailer. The reason for the decision is unknown, however, Shroomish were later added in one of the courses added in the 2.0.0 update.

Concept artwork of one of the many environments in the game. This specific art is depicting what would become the Research Camp course, which is part of L.E.N.S.

Multiple developers were brought onto the project over the course of development, with the team starting out small and ending development with a team of around a "few hundred". At the start of development, the developers of the first Snap game, HAL Laboratory, were approached and consulted during the start of the project. During this phase, the development team considered many different ideas for environments that could appear in-game, with one of the potential environments being in outer space. This idea was eventually rejected due to the selection of Pokémon that could appear being rather limited. Suzaki admitted in an interview that the development team had discussed whether to change Snap's core concept. The team would eventually decide to stick with the core concept after reflecting on the original game and hearing about its development, which he said served as "a big influence on development," and instead the team focused on finding aspects of the concept to expand on in order to sell it to a modern audience. This was in part due to believing that taking photos had become commonplace unlike the first game's release 20 years prior due to the presence of social media and smartphones. Through this, the team developed a vision of the game that kept the core gameplay whilst also adding new features that reflected how people currently interact with photographs. Suzaki explained that "the result is a simple game of taking pictures in a world where Pokémon are alive and well in nature, but at the same time there is a variety of contemporary ways to play with photography", and encouraged for players to use a "combination of these tools, timing, and situations" in order to get better shots.

According to Suzaki, one of the major additions was the implementation of research levels. Whilst the behavior of a course's Pokémon will remain the same, the research levels allow for variations of a course that can exhibit different behavior without a need for the base version to randomly change. The star rating system was another new addition and was created to allow players to understand Pokémon better by taking various different scenes of it, with each star acting as rarity scale on how rare each behavior or action is to encounter. The system itself was built off of the original evaluation system from the first game due to it being perceived as "easy for everyone to understand", and so whilst some internal mechanism of the system was changed, they wanted to keep it simple without it being "too strict or complicated." Another feature from the original Snap that faced scrutiny was the photographic film limit, as modern cameras can store significantly more frames than cameras at the time. Suzaki believed that having a limit was what made playing the game fun so opted to keep the limit but expanded the total camera film to 72 shots; Ishihara elaborated the number was chosen as it was double the original's 36-exposure film, which was the standard limit for cameras around that time. Both the evaluation system and the film limits were designed in order for players to enjoy the other modes such as photo editing and sharing, as the pair anticipated players would want to share their photos on social media. Other additions made included the zoom function on the camera and the ability to edit photos with the Re-Snap feature, with the latter being mentioned by Suzaki as an example of how the game was to designed to enjoyed by everyone and not specifically new players. One of the biggest differences between the original Snap and New Snap is the removal of the Pester Ball item. In the original, the Pester Ball could be thrown at Pokémon to stun, irritate or even knock them out, which according to Suzaki could be "perceived as something a little less kind in current times", so the item did not return. However, he acknowledged that the item did serve a key purpose in Snap's gameplay, so it was decided that its functionality would be added to the Fluffruit item instead, whereby the player can choose to toss the fruit at a Pokémon to annoy it without harm rather than tossing the fruit near them instead.

When developing the game for the Nintendo Switch system, developers wanted to utilize as much of the console as possible, such as using its updated graphics in order to create more detailed environments and varied Pokémon expressions not capable on previous hardware. Suzaki explained it was particularly important for the Pokémon to have complex animations in order to sell the idea that they are part of the world the player would explore. He also mentioned that whilst he wanted the environments to look realistic, they were not meant to be photorealistic, with the end goal of creating a world that "[combined] beautiful backgrounds and complex Pokémon movements that emphasize their individual characteristics." Other functions of the Switch Suzaki mentioned was its gyro function that allowed the console to function like a real camera, its portability that would make it easier for players to show their photos to others, and the Nintendo Switch Online service which would allow players to send their photos to other players globally.

== Release and promotion ==
The game was first revealed in a Pokémon Presents livestream on June 17, 2020, showcasing some of the features and Pokémon that would appear in the game. More details would be revealed in January 2021, such as the game's file size, pricing and a release date of April 30, 2021. The game would later receive another trailer in the following Pokémon Presents in late-February 2021, which was in-celebration of the Pokémon franchise's 25th anniversary. More gameplay footage would eventually be revealed closer to the game's launch date. In Japan, a web video was aired that acted as an overview of the game and featured narration by actor Eiji Akaso. According to Akaso, this was his first time trying narration and for his work received Pokémon-related merchandise from the recording staff. Another commercial for the game featured actor Kokoro Terada and YouTuber Fuwa-chan. The Pokémon Company also partnered with Japanese content creators to promote the game by providing an early live commentaries on their YouTube channels, such comedy duo Shimofuri Myojo and VTubers Shirakami Fubuki, Minato Aqua, and Omaru Polka of Hololive Production. In the lead up to the release of the game, Nintendo launched a website that allowed users to explore the Lental region and earn exclusive rewards such as a picture frame as well as Nintendo Reward Points.

New Pokémon Snap was released worldwide on April 30, 2021, about 22 years after the release of the original Pokémon Snap. Alongside of the release of the game, Nintendo launched a line of themed stationary, such as a letter set, on the My Nintendo loyalty program; the merchandise could be exchanged using Platinum Points. In Japan, CoroCoro Comic hosted a competition where readers would send the publication their best in-game photos for the chance to win. The winner would receive a custom New Pokémon Snap-inspired Nintendo Switch dock decorated with drawings of a camera and the Pokémon Pichu and Meganium, as well as a signature from Pokémon series artist Machito Gomi. On July 16, 2024, New Pokémon Snap released in mainland China due to a partnership between Nintendo and Tencent, becoming the first Pokémon to release in the region since 2000 due to the country's video game console ban lasting from 2000 to 2015. In this version, certain iconography was slightly altered, which was speculated to have been changed due to the icons resembling the emblem of Taiwan.

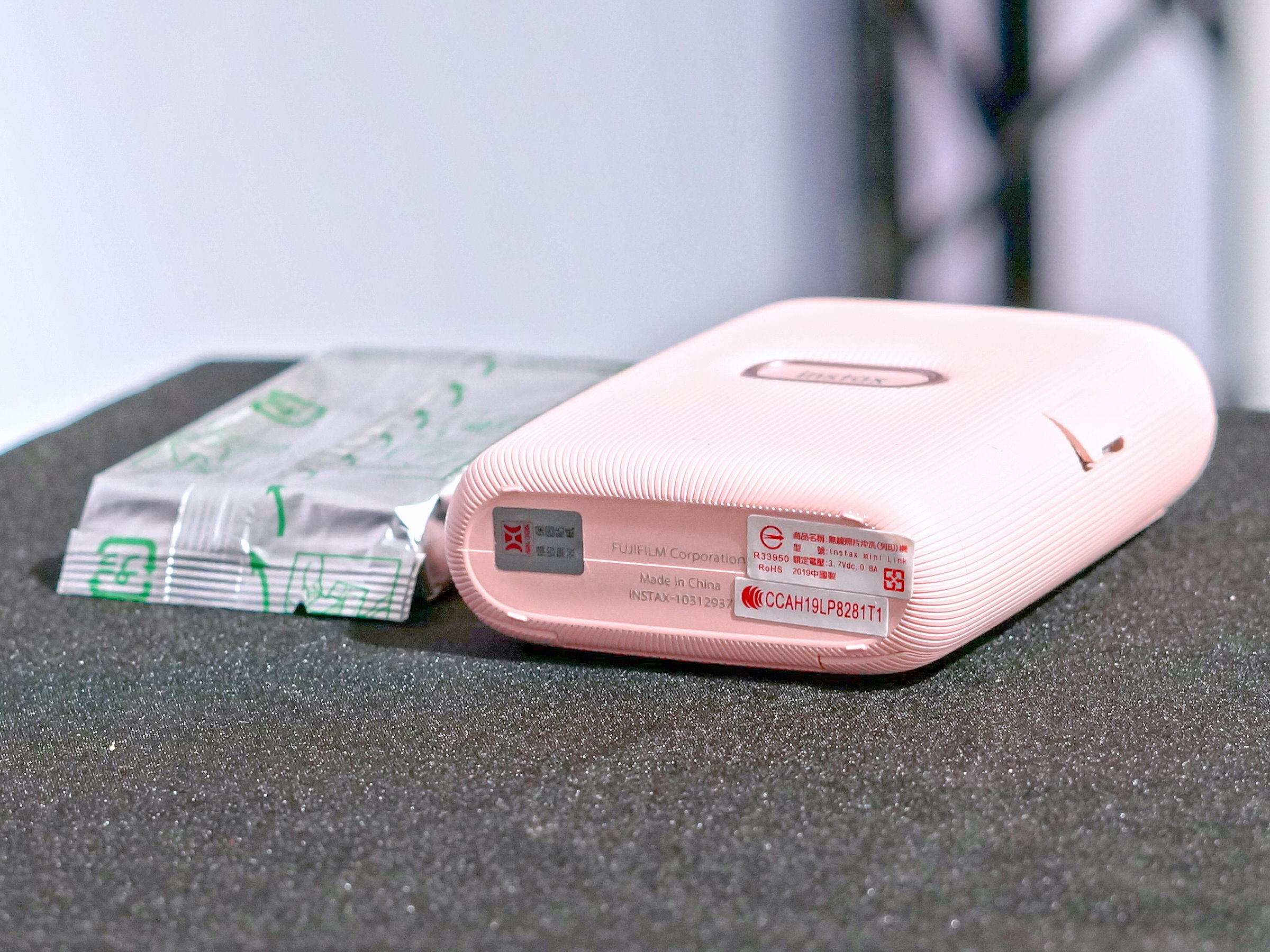
An Instax Mini Link printer could be used to print in-game photos.

To promote the game, Nintendo announced collaborations with different brands and companies. A Pokémon Go in-game event, held from April 29 to May 2, featured Pokémon from the Lental region. In Pokémon the Movie: Secrets of the Jungle, which released four months prior to Snap, a scene involving the protagonists Ash Ketchum and Koko features cameo appearances of both Phil and Rita in the background taking photos together. Conversely, concept art for the movie appear in the game's laboratory. Nintendo worked with Fujifilm to introduce a mobile app on launch day that lets players use their Instax brand of Mini Link printers to print out screenshots stored on the Nintendo Switch, including photos taken in New Pokémon Snap. Before printing, the app allows users to decorate their photos with filters and photo frames inspired by the game, as well as from other games like the Mario franchise and Animal Crossing: New Horizons.

Alongside the release of Snap, a special edition version of the Mini Link with a Nintendo Switch color scheme and a Pikachu-shaped silicon case was also released, which quickly sold out. Japanese network printing service Lawson Print [ja] (ネットワークプリントサービス) collaborated with the game by offering a service to players to have there images from the game become real photos real photos or be used to create calendars. Additionally, they provided print numbers for their multi-copy machines [ja] (マルチメディアステーション) where people could convert their photos into stickers or bromides. This service was later discontinued at the end of September 2021. Nintendo also collaborated with Seven-Eleven Japan for a marketing campaign from April to May 2021, whereby customers who purchased a download card for the game at any Japanese 7-Eleven store could redeem digital wallpaper for their smartphone through a provided website. In June 2021, the official Japanese Pokémon Twitter account held a contest for players called the "Clumsy Photo Contest". The contest saw players go against the game's typically gameplay by tasking them to take and upload "clumsy-looking" photos; entries for the contest saw photos depicting Pokémon that are mid-blink, extremely close to the camera, cut-off or that are not acting photogenic.

=== Updates ===
New Pokémon Snap saw a few updates over the course of its release, with the first update releasing a few days before the game released worldwide. A month after the game's release, the game was updated to version 1.2.0 in order to fix a bug that made completing a LenTalk mission impossible. The mission, "Proud Warrior Request", had the player feed the Pokémon Braviary a fluffruit but due to a bug, the mission would not be registered as completed even if the player accomplished the task.

On July 29, 2021, Nintendo announced a free content update for the game that would release the following week on August 3. The update, referred to as version 2.0.0, added 20 new Pokémon such as Psyduck and Gyarados as well as 3 new courses which have both day and night variants. Each course offered a new perspective to the environment; the Secret Side Path sees the NEO-ONE shrink to where the surrounding Pokémon appear giant, the Mightywide River has the player ride down a river and endure rapids, and the Barren Badlands introduces poisonous environment hazards and Pokémon hidden underground. The latter two courses are automatically unlocked once the game has updated, however, the Secret Side Path requires the player to discover an alternate pathway in the nature park course in order to unlock it. The update also featured extra cosmetics for photo editing and for the player's profile. Quality of life features were also released alongside the update, revamping the LenTalk menu and the ability to restart or exit a course. Additionally, the update added a feature that allowed players to directly save photos onto their Nintendo Switch. To promote the update in Japan, the official Pokémon YouTube channel launched a commercial featuring the actress Ohata Shieri [ja] (大幡しえり); the commercial also included a cover of Aya Matsuura's song "Yeah! Meccha Holiday" performed by singer-songwriter Hanako Oku.

== Reception ==
=== Critical reception ===
Reception

Aggregate scores
Aggregator	Score
Metacritic	79/100 (Note: Based on 116 reviews)
OpenCritic	76% recommended (Note: Based on 127 reviews)

Review scores
Publication	Score
4Players	60/100
Destructoid	8.5/10
Electronic Gaming Monthly	5/5
Famitsu	8/10, 9/10, 8/10, 9/10
Game Informer	8.5/10
GameRevolution	7/10
GameSpot	8/10
HobbyConsolas	84/100
IGN	8/10
Jeuxvideo.com	15/20
Nintendo Life	8/10
Nintendo World Report	7.5/10
NME	3/5
RPGFan	95/100
Shacknews	8/10
TechRadar	2.5/5
The Telegraph	5/5
The Guardian	3/5
VG247	4/5

New Pokémon Snap received generally favorable reviews according to the review aggregator website Metacritic, earning an aggregate score of 79/100 based on 116 reviews. Review aggregator OpenCritic assessed that the game received a strong approval rating from critics, with 76% of the 127 reviews recommending the game. Japanese video game magazine Famitsu gave the game a total score of 34/40 based on four separate reviews, with the individual reviews for the game being 8/10, 9/10, 8/10, 9/10 respectively.

Several critics positively highlighted New Pokémon Snap's gameplay, with many feeling it was an improvement on its predecessor in terms of content. Critics highlighted a variety of features, with one of the standouts being the level of detail in the environments and the Pokémon that inhabit them, with the critics complimenting the variety of Pokémon available to photograph in-game. Writing for IGN, Rebekah Valentine found at its best when the game allowed for lesser marketed Pokémon to get a spotlight and found these moments encouraging to complete the Photodex. Game Informer's Brian Shea praised the development for creating a balance between the Pokémon in their environments which allowed him to never feel overwhelmed by the total amount he encountered in a course. Additionally, he found some of the interactions between Pokémon as jaw-dropping, mentioning an encounter between the species Wingull and Finneon that made him want to replay the level. Jack Rear from The Telegraph expressed that he believed the world was the most alive the franchise had ever felt and praised it as "beautifully designed", adding that he hoped the game's world would help players "better appreciate the wonders of nature in real life too."

Critics positively noted the game's relaxing atmosphere. Inverse's Matt Wille noted this, alongside the repetitiveness, could be frustrating for more "serious" gamers. However, Wille felt the game's relaxing atmosphere and lack of heavy progression allowed for an easier time jumping back into the game after long gaps between play sessions. Paste's Dia Lacina similarly stated that the game's atmosphere was made to be relaxing, citing that the game was able to tap into the childhood nostalgia of exploring the world and discovering different kinds of animals. Jeuxvideo.com's Alexis Zema echoed the sentiments by describing the atmosphere of the game as rather zen and mentioned in his conclusion that "each level is a small marvel in itself". In GameSpot's review, Jenae Sitzes pointed to how to different each courses felt between the day and night versions, with the former always sounding active and alive whilst the latter become calmer and peaceful. She praised these variants as "dynamic addition[s]" and created a "fuller experience of each Pokémon ecosystem". Beth Nicholls of Digital Camera World remarked that the game provided great potential to spawn a new generation of photographers. She citied how the game's comforting environment, focused on improving the player's photography skills and reaction times, helped to educate younger players about photography and had potential to get them into the subject.

The photography gameplay was also praised, with the photo customization and Re-Snap mode in particular highlighted by critics. Destructoid's Eric Van Allen wrote that the game's photography was "incredibly fun" and was good as it had previously was, although advised readers to adjust the camera's sensitivity. Niki Fakhoori from RPGFan called the Re-Snap mode phenomenal due to it being able to save a photo that would have otherwise been ruined. Fakhoori further praised the photo customization, believing that it would extend the overall life of the game. Due to these features, Polygon's Michael McWhertor ascribed Snap as being made specifically for the "Instagram and Snapchat generation." Several critics lauded the game for its gyro controls, with critics from Shacknews and Nintendo World Report considering them a superior to the analogue controls; the latter of which felt the addition was a "natural fit" for the game. In Jon Cartwright's review for Nintendo Life, they highlighted the game had several accessibility features, noting the game had a variety of control options.

Critics were divided on the overall game's sense of progression, with some criticizing the gameplay loop as repetitive. Shannon Liao, writing for The Washington Post, felt the game became repetitive and over reliant on replaying levels as players progressed through the game. James Galizio of RPG Site similarly felt that the amount of times players had to re-do levels to progress the story made the game much more unenjoyable to play, also criticizing how an option to speed up a given level was saved for the end of the game. TechRadar's Adam Vjestica panned the repetition of the courses, feeling that moments and scenarios with Pokémon became charmless upon repeat playthroughs of courses; Vjestica summarised that this caused the game to feel "laborious" and unrewarding for players to sink their time into. Some critics felt as though progression was also unclear at times, with vague hints of how to progress. McWhertor believed the LenTalk requests elevated New Snap's replayability by allowing players to discover new moments an environment and given cosmetics as a reward. However, he lamented that some of the requests felt poorly explained and led to taking photos that ended up not being the actual request, with McWhertor finding these trial-and-error moments to be somewhat detracting. However, other critics felt the game's progression allowed players to more actively engage with photography. In EGM's review, Michael Goroff praised how the plot would feed into the game's structure and that in addition to other forms of progression, such as the course level system, encouraged players to search for good photography spots; Goroff would go onto to describe the feeling of completing a level as satisfying despite being easy to accomplish. Lynn Lottie of Eurogamer felt the incorporation of Research Levels helped with stymying the game's repetitiveness. Janae Sitzes of GameSpot similarly felt that Research Levels allowed for the game to have a strong postgame, as players could continue discovering and expanding on pre-existing areas even after the main story is completed.

The game's boss battles were similarly divisive. Paul Tamburro from GameRevolution panned them for feeling sluggish and described them as being "nothing is more emblematic of New Pokémon Snap's tedious padding." On the other hand, Valentine praised them for their utilization of "careful timing and clever puzzle-solving", though admitted she was surprised that Xerneas was picked as the game's final boss, considering the choice as strange. Similarly, James Galizio from RPG Site highlighted them as one of his favorite parts of the game due to them encouraging the use of the player's items and for not needing to be repeated many times.

Some critics also expressed disappointment with a lack of evolutions in the various courses, a feature in the original game that allowed wild Pokémon to evolve into new forms while exploring. Other critics felt that Professor Mirror's photography rating system was too judgmental, and did not do a good job judging on the actual skill required to take a photograph. In her review, Valentine found some of Mirror's judgements off at times due to him sometimes not being able to recognize a Pokémon's behavior properly, causing different ratings from similar looking photos depicting the same thing. Whilst she noted it was a rarity when this occurred, she stated that she would feel rather disappointed when it would happen. Writing for Fanbyte, Kenneth Shepard opined that he wished the game would acknowledge other photography techniques, such as the rule of thirds, when factoring in the photo scores and felt that Mirror was hindering good photos; however, Shepard acknowledged that the game does not actively stop players from photographing what they want. Other reviewers commented on whether the game formula should have evolved. In their review for 4Players, Matthias Schmid criticised the developers for not giving the player the ability to have freedom in the environment, stating he found it unfortunate that you could not personally get up-close to the Pokémon. Conversely, Javier Escribano of HobbyConsolas rejected this notion by comparing Snap to other arcade-style games such Virtua Cop and The House of the Dead, adding that "while the idea might be tempting, it would not be Pokémon Snap anymore."

=== Fandom ===
Several particular Pokémon featured in the game grew popular within its dedicated fandom. An image of a Wurmple staring blankly at the sky, for example, garnered many memes and social media reactions as a result of many seeing it as cute and relatable. Bidoof's appearance in the game also saw a strong reaction, with images depicting the Pokémon topping the in-game photo leaderboards in terms of score as a result of its cute appearance and pre-existing association with internet memes.

One fan designed and 3D printed a custom gyro controller attachment for the Switch's Joy-Cons that resembles the in-game camera. By hooking the camera controller up to a third-party tool, it was to play the game using motion controls. According to its creator, the controller was inspired by the Nintendo Labo VR Kit's camera attachment and was created as a result of feeling frustrated that the game never made for the Wii U, believing the console would have been perfect for a Snap game.

=== Sales ===
New Pokémon Snap sold 194,385 physical copies within its first week on sale in Japan, making it the best-selling retail game of the week in the country. By the end of 2021, the game had sold over 312,000 copies in the country. In the United Kingdom, it sold four times as many physical copies at launch as its predecessor game, also taking the number one place in sales for April 2021 in just two days. Similarly in the US, the game had doubled in sales compared to the original. In Europe, the game was the 3rd most-downloaded game on the Nintendo eShop in April 2021, only behind Monster Hunter Rise and Minecraft. By June 30, 2021, the game had sold 2.07 million copies. As of March 2022, New Pokémon Snap has sold 2.4 million copies.

=== Awards and accolades ===
Publications such as Automaton Japan, Game Developer, TheGamer, The Indiependent, Nintendo Life, RPGFan and Tom's Guide have listed New Pokémon Snap as one of the best games of 2021. The game was nominated for Best Family Game at The Game Awards 2021, however, it lost to It Takes Two. At the 2021 Golden Joystick Awards, the game was nominated for the Nintendo Game of the Year award, but lost to Metroid Dread.
