= Pokémon Legends: Arceus =

2022 video game

- Key art featuring the playable characters Rei (left) and Akari (right) along with their Pokémon
- Developer: Game Freak
- Publishers: JP: The Pokémon Company; WW: Nintendo
- Director: Kazumasa Iwao
- Producers: Shigeru Ohmori; Akira Kinashi; Toyokazu Nonaka; Takanori Sowa; Kenji Endo
- Designer: Yuichi Murase
- Programmer: Kazuki Saita
- Artist: Suguru Nakatsui
- Writer: Toshinobu Matsumiya
- Composers: Go Ichinose; Hitomi Sato; Hiromitsu Maeba
- Series: Pokémon
- Platform: Nintendo Switch
- Release: 28 January 2022
- Genre: Action role-playing
- Mode: Single-player

Pokémon Legends: Arceus (Note: Japanese: Pokémon LEGENDS(ポケモンレジェンズ) アルセウス, Hepburn: Pokémon Rejenzu: Aruseusu) is a 2022 action role-playing game developed by Game Freak and published by Nintendo and The Pokémon Company for the Nintendo Switch. It is part of the eighth generation of the Pokémon video game series and serves as a prequel to the fourth-generation titles Pokémon Diamond and Pearl (2006). The game was first announced as part of the Pokémon 25th Anniversary event in February 2021, and was released worldwide on 28 January 2022.

The game follows the protagonist, who is sent back in time and travels through the Hisui region, which is based on the island of Hokkaido during early Japanese colonization. The game is centered around exploration of the region's several open areas populated with Pokémon, with its main objective being to complete the Pokédex by catching all Pokémon. Pokémon Legends: Arceus was a commercial success, having sold over 14.83 million copies by 31 March 2023. It was also a critical success, receiving generally favourable reviews, and being nominated for several end of the year awards, including Best RPG at The Game Awards 2022. A second Legends game, Pokémon Legends: Z-A, was released in 2025.

== Gameplay ==
A player exploring the Coronet Highlands region with Hisuian Braviary

Pokémon Legends: Arceus is an action role-playing game that maintains the core gameplay of past mainline entries. The player can freely explore the game map, which is divided into five large areas of individual biomes. Each time the player enters an area, they spawn in a camp and can fast travel to other camps in the same area. Outside of traversing the landscape on foot, the player can unlock rideable Pokémon which can travel faster, swim across bodies of water, climb cliffs, or fly. In each area, Pokémon wander the landscape and certain habitats and will interact with both the player and their environments. Some will actively avoid the player, while others act aggressively, and some exhibit other specific behaviors. "Alpha" Pokémon – larger, more powerful versions of the Pokémon – can also be found in the areas. The game world having multiple areas and a hub system instead of fully open world gameplay resulted in reviewers comparing Legends: Arceus with the Monster Hunter series. Reviewers also drew comparisons between Pokémon Legends: Arceus and The Legend of Zelda: Breath of the Wild, noting apparent similarities in both gameplay and art style.

A player engaging an alpha Garchomp

Unlike in previous titles, the player character can be attacked and harmed by wild Pokémon. If enough damage is taken, they will fall unconscious and reappear at the base camp. Players can capture wild Pokémon in the overworld without engaging in battle, though some must be battled before being caught. Battles can be initiated by releasing captured Pokémon near a wild Pokémon. While the game retains the turn-based battle system of prior titles, Legends: Arceus allows players to trade attack damage for more turns and vice versa. Outside of standard battles, the game also has special boss battles where the player character must dodge and attack powerful Pokémon, with regular turn-based battles being included during the fights as opportunities to stun them.

By battling, capturing, or engaging with other interactions with Pokémon, players progress in completing their Pokédex entries. Players can also take on and complete side quests given by NPCs in the game. In total, the game featured 242 Pokémon on release, including 7 new species and 17 new iterations ("forms") of existing Pokémon. At the start of the game, three starter Pokémon are available: Rowlet (from Sun and Moon), Cyndaquil (from Gold and Silver) and Oshawott (from Black and White). Pokémon Legends: Arceus is the first mainline game to feature starter Pokémon from different regions together. While players can trade Pokémon online, Legends: Arceus does not feature multiplayer battles, unlike previous installments in the series.

== Plot ==
=== Setting ===
The game is set in the Sinnoh region centuries before the events of Pokémon Diamond and Pearl and their remakes, at a time when the region was known as Hisui.

Most of Hisui is covered in sparse, open wilderness populated with wild Pokémon, with a single significant settlement and several small campsites. Unlike previous Pokémon games, Pokémon are treated as wild animals or forces of nature instead of as companions or partners. Poké Balls are made of "Apricorn" fruit and puff steam when a Pokémon is caught, while the Pokédex is a paper notebook.

=== Story ===
The game begins with the player speaking with a disembodied voice which is revealed to be Arceus, the creator deity of the Pokémon universe, who tasks the player with encountering all Pokémon in the Hisui region before transporting them there through a rift in spacetime. Upon arrival, Pokémon researcher Professor Laventon finds them and brings them to the local settlement of Jubilife Village. There, the player is recruited into the Survey Corps of the Galaxy Expedition Team, a group that has arrived in Hisui to chart and study it. After receiving their starter Pokémon, the player travels through the Hisui region to complete the Pokédex; throughout their journey, the spacetime rift causes several powerful "Noble Pokémon", which the Diamond and Pearl clans venerate, to turn berserk through powerful lightning, forcing the player to engage them in battle using 'balms' to calm them down.

After the player defeats five noble Pokémon, the spacetime rift intensifies, which Commander Kamado, leader of the Galaxy Team, blames the player for and banishes them from Jubilife Village, leaving them to uncover the cause of the rift and stop it alone. Working with either the Diamond or Pearl clans and under the care of the folklore researcher Cogita, the player travels to the three major lakes of Hisui to encounter the legendary Pokémon Azelf, Mesprit, and Uxie, three beings who embody willpower, emotion, and knowledge respectively. As the player passes their trials, they provide materials to craft the Red Chain, which is needed to stop the rift. After defeating Commander Kamado at the summit, the player reaches the peak of Mount Coronet: the Temple of Sinnoh, located at the center of the region. Depending on the clan the player worked with, either Dialga (Diamond Clan) or Palkia (Pearl Clan) appears and breaks the Red Chain, but the player catches them before their enraged counterpart emerges. Using the fragments of the Red Chain, a special Poké Ball capable of capturing the other legendary Pokémon is crafted. The player battles the legendary Pokémon in its Original Form and captures it, sealing the spacetime rift.

In the post-game, the player teams up with Volo, a member of the Ginkgo Guild merchant group who assisted them, to find the Plates associated with Arceus. As they do, the player encounters several legendary Pokémon, each one holding a Plate. Upon arriving at the Temple of Sinnoh for the last Plate, Volo betrays the player and attempts to steal the Plates from them to draw out Arceus and subjugate it to create a new world using its powers. He also reveals he allied with Giratina to open the spacetime rift in a failed attempt to drive out Arceus, sending the caught legendary mad. The player defeats both Volo and Giratina, securing the final Plate and transforming the Celestica Flute into the Azure Flute. Once all other Pokémon (excluding promotional Pokémon which require outside games to acquire) have been captured, the player can play the Azure Flute at the Temple of Sinnoh to encounter Arceus. After the player proves themselves in battle, Arceus bestows upon them a part of itself so that it can explore the world that it created by their side.

== Development ==
=== Marketing and release ===
Pokémon Legends: Arceus was first revealed in the Pokémon Presents on 26 February 2021 alongside Pokémon Brilliant Diamond and Shining Pearl as part of the Pokémon 25th Anniversary celebration. It was referred to as a "pre-remake" (a portmanteau of prequel and remake) of previous Sinnoh games (Diamond, Pearl, and Platinum) by the official Pokémon Twitter account. During a Pokémon Presents on 18 August 2021, new trailer was revealed with a focus on exploration and story background, as well as new Pokémon. On 28 September 2021, a new trailer showcased some of the game's customization, menus, characters, and Kleavor, a new Pokémon. On 19 October 2021, an artificially corrupted "found footage" CGI video was showcased teasing new Pokémon. Two days later, it was confirmed that the obscured Pokémon were regional forms of Zorua and Zoroark. On 9 December 2021, the official Pokémon Twitter account teased a Poké Ball-related announcement for Legends: Arceus. The next day, a regional variant of Voltorb, a Pokémon based on Poké Balls, was announced. On 15 December 2021, a new trailer showcased several factions present in the game, as well as their leaders. On 7 January 2022, an overview trailer was released in Japanese, showcasing the world, people, and Pokémon. However, the trailer was not localized into English until 24 January 2022.

The game was released worldwide on 28 January 2022.

A free content update, Daybreak, was announced and released on 27 February 2022.

==== Tie-ins ====
Announced in April 2022, an ONA webseries tie-in, titled Pokémon: Hisuian Snow, debuted on YouTube and Pokémon TV on 18 May 2022. The series focuses on a young boy who befriends a Hisuian Zorua in Hisui. The series received a Webby Award as the "People's Voice Winner." The series A limited 4-episode ONA webseries tie-in, titled Pokémon: The Arceus Chronicles, debuted on Amazon Prime Video in Japan in January 2022 and debuted on Netflix on 23 September 2022.

== Reception ==
=== Critical reception ===
Reception

Aggregate scores
Aggregator	Score
Metacritic	83/100
OpenCritic	85% recommend

Review scores
Publication	Score
Destructoid	8/10
Famitsu	38/40
Game Informer	8.75/10
GameSpot	8/10
GamesRadar+	4.5/5
Hardcore Gamer	4.5/5
IGN	7/10
Jeuxvideo.com	16/20
Nintendo Life	9/10
Nintendo World Report	9/10
Shacknews	8/10
Video Games Chronicle	5/5
VG247	4/5

Pokémon Legends: Arceus received "generally favorable reviews", according to review aggregator website Metacritic. OpenCritic determined that 85% of critics recommended the game. Andrew Webster of The Verge praised the game's overhaul of the Pokémon formula, particularly the world design and Pokédex challenges, writing that it was "the biggest overhaul to the Pokémon formula since the series debuted". Despite criticizing the battle system, Ryan Gilliam of Polygon liked the open world and how simple catching Pokémon was compared to previous entries, saying: "It's so easy and fluid to just grab a Pokémon and add them to my party while I'm exploring the game's verdant fields or snowy tundra".

Jordan Middler of Nintendo Life praised Pokémon Legends: Arceus for its "rewarding" exploration, "addictive" catching mechanics, quality of the Pokémon roster, and its "genuine sense of scale", while stating that "Pokémon Legends: Arceus is quite simply one of the greatest Pokémon games ever made". Jessica Scharnagle of Dot Esports stated that many of the tedious mechanics and forced activities in prior games were better simplified or removed to give the players more freedom in gameplay, while criticizing the game's performance.

Chris Tapsell of Eurogamer enjoyed the new animations and art for the Pokémon in Arceus, saying "The way wild Pokémon, more vibrantly animated here than in any previous game, are all hops, rolls, lumbers. All splashes, naps, growls, and waddles. The way they exist so unelaborately but with so much personality is such a simple treat". Andrew Cunningham of Ars Technica disliked the graphical style and lack of new Pokémon, but felt the battle system and open world exploration mixed well together, saying: "And when the battle is over, you can go right back to exploring or catching other Pokémon, with no pauses for level-ups or learning moves [...] once you learn the ropes, it's easy to lose yourself in the rhythm of sneaking, catching, battling, and exploring". Tom Regan of The Guardian praised the exploration and the changes in gameplay compared to earlier entries in the franchise, saying: "For arguably the first time since the series began, everything feels fresh, and thrillingly unpredictable", but criticized the quality of the game's visuals, comparing it unfavorably to that of The Legend of Zelda: Breath of the Wild and Xenoblade Chronicles 2.

Pokémon Legends: Arceus was nominated for several end of the year awards; it was nominated for Best RPG at The Game Awards 2022, as well as nominated for Game of the Year by GamesRadar, GamingBolt, The Washington Post, Empire, VGC, GamesHub, and Polygon.

=== Sales ===
As of 31 March 2023, the game has sold 14.83 million copies. Nintendo reported that the game sold 6.5 million copies worldwide within a week of release, outpacing other Nintendo Switch Pokémon titles such as Sword and Shield and Brilliant Diamond and Shining Pearl.

In Japan, it sold 1.42 million physical copies within three days, and another 645,000 throughout February to top sales charts in both months. It sold 125,851 units in March, making it the second best-selling game of the month (below Kirby and the Forgotten Land).

In the United States, Legends: Arceus was the best-selling video game in January 2022 (excluding digital downloads). It was the second best-selling game the following month and sixth in March, making it the second best-selling game during the first quarter of 2022 (second only to Elden Ring).

=== Accolades ===
Year	Award	Category	Result	Ref.
2022	Japan Game Awards	Award for Excellence	Won	
2022	Golden Joystick Awards	Nintendo Game of the Year	Won	
2022	The Game Awards 2022	Best Role Playing Game	Nominated	
2023	New York Game Awards	Statue of Liberty Award for Best World	Nominated	
2023	New York Game Awards	Central Park Children's Zoo Award for Best Kids Game	Nominated	
