= Pokémon Brilliant Diamond and Shining Pearl =

2021 video games

Pokémon Brilliant Diamond; Pokémon Shining Pearl
- Left: Icon for Brilliant Diamond, depicting the legendary Pokémon Dialga; Right: Icon for Shining Pearl, depicting the legendary Pokémon Palkia
- Developer: ILCA (Note: Original game developed by Game Freak.)
- Publishers: JP: The Pokémon Company; WW: Nintendo
- Directors: Yuichi Ueda; Junichi Masuda
- Producers: Akira Kinashi; Toyokazu Nonaka; Takanori Sowa; Kenji Endo; Shunsuke Kohori
- Designer: Jun Taniguchi
- Programmer: Shinya Suda
- Artists: Yasuko Takahashi; Misato Takahashi
- Writer: Junichi Masuda
- Composers: Shota Kageyama; Junichi Masuda
- Series: Pokémon
- Engine: Unity
- Platform: Nintendo Switch
- Release: 19 November 2021
- Genre: Role-playing
- Modes: Single-player, multiplayer

Pokémon Brilliant Diamond (Note: Japanese: ポケットモンスター ブリリアントダイヤモンド, Hepburn: Poketto Monsutā Buririanto Daiyamondo; "Pocket Monsters Brilliant Diamond") and Pokémon Shining Pearl (Note: Japanese: ポケットモンスター シャイニングパール, Hepburn: Poketto Monsutā Shainingu Pāru; "Pocket Monsters Shining Pearl") are 2021 remakes of the 2006 Nintendo DS role-playing video games Pokémon Diamond and Pearl. The games were developed by ILCA and published by Nintendo and The Pokémon Company for the Nintendo Switch. The promotional material described these games as being faithful remakes of Pokémon Diamond and Pearl. The games were released on 19 November 2021. They were announced as part of the 25th anniversary event, alongside Pokémon Legends: Arceus.

Brilliant Diamond and Shining Pearl received mixed reviews from critics, with praise directed towards their faithfulness to the original games and quality of life improvements, but were divided over certain changes, the games' visual design, and lack of features (e.g. the Sinnoh Battle Frontier) from Pokémon Platinum.

== Gameplay ==
A Pokémon battle in the game, depicting a Luxray against a Tentacool

Gameplay of Pokémon Brilliant Diamond and Shining Pearl is similar to the original Diamond and Pearl games, comparable to previous remakes such as Omega Ruby and Alpha Sapphire. The games are presented in a top-down isometric third-person perspective, though with a distinct visual style.

== Setting ==
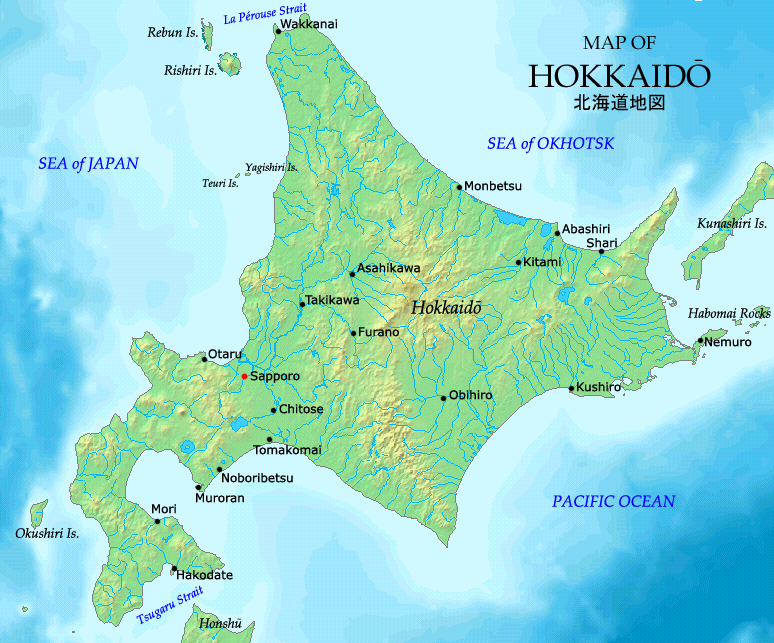
The Sinnoh Region is based on the Japanese island of Hokkaidō.

As with the original games, Brilliant Diamond and Shining Pearl are set in the fictional region of Sinnoh, an island based on the Japanese island of Hokkaidō.

== Development and release ==
Brilliant Diamond and Shining Pearl were developed by ILCA; as such, they are the first main-series Pokémon games to have a different company as the lead developer instead of Game Freak. They were directed by Yuichi Ueda from ILCA and Junichi Masuda from Game Freak, the director of the original games.

Possible development on remakes of Diamond and Pearl had been leaked on 15 January 2021, when a "diamondpearl" subdomain of the Pokémon website was registered and published. Shortly after, the domain was taken offline. On 26 February 2021, the day of the Pokémon 25th Anniversary Pokémon Presents presentation, several leakers claimed that the upcoming livestream would announce remakes of Diamond and Pearl, titled Brilliant Diamond and Shining Pearl, alongside an action role-playing game also set in the Sinnoh Region, later revealed to be Pokémon Legends: Arceus. During the Pokémon Presents, Brilliant Diamond and Shining Pearl were announced for the Nintendo Switch with a tentative late 2021 release date.

On 26 May 2021, a release date of 19 November 2021 was announced along with a reveal of the games box art. During the reveal of the Nintendo Switch OLED model on 6 July 2021, footage displaying improved visuals for the games was shown. A Pokémon Presents presentation on 18 August 2021 showed new features including character customization, the return of The Underground which is now called The Grand Underground, Poké Ball decorations (now renamed Stickers rather than Seals), the Union Room, Super Contest Shows, and Pokémon being able to follow the player. It was revealed that a Pokémon egg of the Mythical Pokémon Manaphy would be available from Mystery Gift as an early purchase bonus until 21 February 2022.

On 28 September 2021, on the 15th anniversary of the original Pokémon Diamond and Pearl, a new trailer was released showcasing the Pokétch with Hidden Moves, Poffins, Pokémon party following the player in Hearthome City's Amity Square, "stat trainers" (trainers specialising in a specific Pokémon statistic) Cheryl and Riley, and Eterna City Gym Leader Gardenia. On 26 October, another trailer was released featuring Snowpoint City Gym Leader Candice and Sunyshore City Gym Leader Volkner; Team Galactic Commanders Mars, Jupiter and Saturn, and Team Galactic Boss Cyrus; and the three Legendary Lake Pokémon Mesprit, Azelf, and Uxie. Moreover, it was announced that the outfits of the protagonists Lucas and Dawn from Pokémon Platinum would be available from Mystery Gift as an early purchase bonus until 21 February 2022. An overview trailer summarizing the main features of the games was released on 5 November 2021 on the official Japanese Nintendo YouTube channel.

Pokémon Brilliant Diamond and Shining Pearl have been described as having a "litany of glitches", with numerous glitches discovered within weeks after release. This includes the ability to walk through walls to catch the Mythical Pokémon Shaymin, access the location for the Darkrai event location early and to speedrun the game in 23 minutes, as well as an exploit to duplicate multiple Pokémon at a time along with their held items. Several of these glitches were fixed in version 1.1.2 released on 1 December 2021. Patch 1.3.0 added the Azure Flute, making the Hall of Origin area from the original releases legitimately accessible for the first time and allowing players to catch Arceus, provided they have a save file of Pokémon Legends: Arceus with the game's story completed.

== Reception ==
=== Pre-release ===
After the announcement, fans were divided on the new chibi art style shown in the trailer. Opponents argued that the graphics were a downgrade compared to the two previous Pokémon remakes (Omega Ruby and Alpha Sapphire and Let's Go, Pikachu! and Let's Go, Eevee!). Proponents argued the new look stays faithful to the original 2D games while making the leap to 3D.

=== Critical reception ===
Reception

Aggregate scores
Aggregator	Score
Metacritic	73/100
OpenCritic	53% recommend

Review scores
Publication	Score
Computer Games Magazine	7/10
Destructoid	6.5/10
Digital Trends	3.5/5
Easy Allies	6.5/10
Famitsu	34/40
Game Informer	8.5/10
GameSpot	7/10
Hardcore Gamer	4.5/5
IGN	8/10
Jeuxvideo.com	15/20
Nintendo Life	6/10
Nintendo World Report	8.5/10
NME	3/5
RPGamer	2.5/5
Shacknews	7/10

Brilliant Diamond and Shining Pearl received "mixed or average" reviews from critics, according to the review aggregator website Metacritic. Fellow review aggregator OpenCritic assessed that the games received fair approval, being recommended by 53% of critics. The game earned a 34 out of 40 total score from Japanese magazine Famitsu based on individual scores of 8, 9, 8, and 9.

Rebekah Valentine of IGN gave the games an 8 out of 10, stating: "Like the themes of its story, Pokémon Brilliant Diamond and Shining Pearl are solid and enduring – leaning on the past, with all of its triumphs and tripwires." They would ultimately declare that "If a good remake is defined by its loyalty to the original, then Pokémon Brilliant Diamond and Shining Pearl are very good remakes indeed," but lamented that they "weren’t braver in how they improved upon the originals in the same way other Pokémon remakes were." Game Informer's John Carson likewise called the titles "faithful remakes" of the DS games, but that they "deviate from the mechanical blueprint, with varying degree of success." He would go on to praise the graphics engine which was "mostly free of framerate drops or the slowdown that plagues other 3D entries in the series," and declare the games "a welcome throwback to a simpler time when I felt completing a Pokédex was a somewhat realistic task to undertake."

While the games' stylized chibi art style was mostly praised by IGN with the exception of certain story sequences meant to be taken seriously, others such as Destructoid's Chris Carter felt that the visuals took some getting used to. He said that while the region can be a "joy to explore", developer ILCA tried to stick too closely to the originals while adding a few new features on top, leading to a disjointed experience. In addition, the inability to turn off the Experience Share feature can result in the player's Pokémon being over-leveled for the majority of the game, making battles with NPCs "a chore" rather than a legitimate challenge. Jordan Middler from Nintendo Life declared the change in art style to be "for the worse" and that the characters resembled "emotionless Funko Pops", but the correctly proportioned character models in battles were considerably better. ILCA's decision to exclude story elements and features seen in Pokémon Platinum was also seen as a detriment, but the inclusion of the new Grand Underground area made up for the otherwise limited selection of Pokémon originally included in Diamond and Pearl. GameSpot's Steve Watts praised the chibi art style and quality-of-life improvements while criticizing the franchise's lack of evolution and difficulty spike the Elite Four represented. Takuya Watanabe of IGN Japan gave the games a 5 out of 10, criticizing them for staying overly faithful to Diamond and Pearl, noting the awkward appearance of the chibi characters in closeup, and concluding that the games would mostly appeal to players with nostalgia for the originals.

=== Sales ===
Pokémon Brilliant Diamond and Shining Pearl sold 1.39 million copies in its first three days in Japan alone, surpassing the launch sales of Pokémon Sword and Shield in the same period in that region. It became the second-biggest launch for a Switch release in Japan after Animal Crossing: New Horizons in 2020, and the second best-selling game launch of 2021 in the UK behind FIFA 22. The games collectively sold 6 million copies worldwide one week after release. As of 30 June 2022, the games had sold 14.79 million copies worldwide. As of 31 December 2022, the games had sold 15.06 million copies worldwide.

In Spain, the games sold 228,000 copies in 2021.
