= Pokémon Diamond and Pearl =

2006 video games

Pokémon Diamond; Pokémon Pearl
- North American box art for Pokémon Diamond and Pokémon Pearl, depicting the legendary Pokémon Dialga and Palkia respectively
- Developer: Game Freak
- Publishers: JP: The Pokémon Company; WW: Nintendo
- Director: Junichi Masuda
- Producers: Hiroyuki Jinnai; Hitoshi Yamagami; Gakuji Nomoto; Hiroaki Tsuru
- Designers: Shigeki Morimoto; Shigeru Ohmori
- Programmer: Tetsuya Watanabe
- Artist: Ken Sugimori
- Writers: Toshinobu Matsumiya; Hitomi Sato; Akihito Tomisawa; Suguru Nakatsui
- Composers: Go Ichinose; Junichi Masuda; Hitomi Sato; Morikazu Aoki
- Series: Pokémon
- Platform: Nintendo DS
- Release: JP: September 28, 2006; NA: April 22, 2007; AU: June 21, 2007; EU: July 27, 2007; KOR: February 14, 2008
- Genre: Role-playing
- Modes: Single-player, multiplayer

Pokémon Diamond Version (Note: Japanese: ポケットモンスター ダイヤモンド, Hepburn: Poketto Monsutā Daiyamondo; "Pocket Monsters: Diamond") and Pokémon Pearl Version (Note: Japanese: ポケットモンスター パール, Hepburn: Poketto Monsutā Pāru; "Pocket Monsters: Pearl") are role-playing video games developed by Game Freak and published by The Pokémon Company and Nintendo for the Nintendo DS in 2006. They are the first installments in the fourth generation of the Pokémon video game series. They were first released in Japan on September 28, 2006, and released in North America, Australia, and Europe in 2007. Pokémon Platinum, a third version, was released two years later. Remakes titled Pokémon Brilliant Diamond and Shining Pearl were released for the Nintendo Switch worldwide on November 19, 2021. A prequel, Pokémon Legends: Arceus, was released for the Nintendo Switch on January 28, 2022.

Like previous Pokémon games, Diamond and Pearl chronicle the adventures of a young Pokémon Trainer as they train and battle Pokémon while also thwarting the schemes of a criminal organization called Team Galactic. The games added many new features, such as Internet play over the Nintendo Wi-Fi Connection, changes to battle mechanics and Pokémon Contests, along with the addition of 107 new Pokémon. The games are independent of each other but feature largely the same plot, and while both can be played separately, it is necessary to trade between them in order to complete the games' Pokédex.

Development of Diamond and Pearl was announced at a Nintendo press conference in the fourth calendar quarter of 2004. The games were designed with features of the Nintendo DS in mind. It was forecasted to be released in Japan in 2005, but ultimately shipped in 2006, the 10th anniversary year of the franchise. In promotion of the games, Nintendo sold a limited-edition Nintendo DS Lite in Japan, and held a release party celebrating their North American release.

The games received generally favorable reviews. Most critics praised the addition of Wi-Fi features and graphics, and felt that the gameplay, though it had not received much updating from previous games, was still engaging. The games enjoyed more commercial success than their Game Boy Advance predecessors: with around 18 million units sold worldwide, Diamond and Pearl have sold over 2 million more units than their predecessors Pokémon Ruby and Sapphire and almost 6 million more units than Pokémon FireRed and LeafGreen, while also outselling their successors, Pokémon Black and White, by over 2 million copies. The games are among the most successful Pokémon games of all time.

== Gameplay ==
The bottom screen of the Nintendo DS displays the Pokétch, a multi-functional device with features related to time tracking and player status.

Pokémon Diamond and Pearl are role-playing video games with adventure elements. The basic mechanics of the games are largely the same as their predecessors. As with all Pokémon games for handheld consoles, the gameplay is in a third-person overhead perspective, and consists of three basic screens: a field map, in which the player navigates the main character; a battle screen; and the menu, in which the player configures their party, items, or gameplay settings. Players begin the game with no Pokémon or Poké Balls but are given the choice of three Pokémon as a part of the storyline. Once Poké Balls are obtained, the player can capture more Pokémon. Players can use their Pokémon to deal damage to other Pokémon in battle. Whenever the player encounters a wild Pokémon or is challenged by a trainer to a battle, the screen switches to a turn-based battle screen where the Pokémon fight. During the battle, the player may use a move, use an item, switch the active Pokémon, or flee. Fleeing is not an option during battles against trainers. All Pokémon have hit points (HP); whenever a Pokémon's HP is reduced to zero, it faints and cannot battle unless revived at a Pokémon Center or with an item. If the player's Pokémon defeats the opposing Pokémon by causing it to faint, it receives experience points. After accumulating enough experience points, it will level up; most Pokémon evolve into a new species of Pokémon whenever they reach a certain level. Pokémon's stats also increase every time it levels up, and they will also learn new moves at certain levels as well. If a Pokémon is prevented from evolving it will learn new moves faster.

Apart from battling, capturing Pokémon returns as a critical component of Pokémon gameplay. Although other trainers' Pokémon cannot be captured, the player can use different kinds of Poké Balls on a wild Pokémon during battle. A successful capture adds the Pokémon to the player's active party or stores it if the player already has a maximum of six Pokémon in their party. Factors in the success rate of capture include the HP of the target Pokémon and the strength of the Poké Ball used; the lower the target's HP and the stronger the Poké Ball, the higher the success rate of capture is. Also, inflicting certain status effects such as sleep or paralysis adds a multiplier to the capture rate, making it easier to capture wild Pokémon. Each species has a capture rate of its own as well.

=== New features ===
As with other generations of Pokémon games, Diamond and Pearl retain the basic gameplay of their predecessors while introducing additional new features. The day-night cycle makes a return and has increased from three times of day in Gold and Silver to five time periods in Diamond and Pearl: morning, day, afternoon, evening, and night. (Note: In the game mechanics that depend on the time of day, afternoon counts as day, and evening counts as night.) Diamond and Pearl also introduce several changes to battle mechanics. In previous generations, Pokémon moves were classified as "physical" or "special" based on their type; for example, all Fire-type moves were special and all Ground-type moves were physical. In Diamond and Pearl, however, moves are categorized into three groups. Attacks that make physical contact with the opponent are "physical", attacks that do not make physical contact are "special", and moves that do not deal damage are classified as "status".

Some of the games' new features capitalize on the Nintendo DS's features. The Pokétch, (Note: Pokétch (ポケッチ, Poketchi)) a simulated smartwatch, resides on the DS's bottom screen and hosts various applications including a clock, calculator, map, counter, and a drawing pad. These applications are obtained throughout the game. Beneath Sinnoh's surface is the Underground, (Note: Underground (ちかつうろ, Chikatsūro)) a large area used for wireless multiplayer gaming; (Note: Via DS wireless communication, not Nintendo Wi-Fi Connection) in it, players can create and decorate secret bases, first featured in Pokémon Ruby and Sapphire, and participate in minigames. The items mined in the Underground can then be transferred into the player's bag in the main game. Diamond and Pearl also employ support for the Nintendo Wi-Fi Connection (since discontinued), allowing players to communicate through voice chat, trade, and battle online. The main system for trade is the Global Trade Station, which allows players to trade with people around the world. Players can search for any Pokémon that they have seen in the game and can offer their own; if another player is offering the requested Pokémon and is looking for the offered Pokémon, the trade occurs immediately. A trade does not have to be instant; an offer can be left for other players to browse and complete, even while the player is offline. Certain species of Pokémon traded internationally will have a Pokédex entry in the language of the game it originated from. According to Pokémon art director Ken Sugimori, the Global Trade Station was the new feature he was most pleased with.

Pokémon Contests are events in which the player's Pokémon compete in a show to win ribbons and, in Diamond and Pearl, they consist of three stages, two more than the Contests of the Game Boy Advance games. In the Visual Competition stage, players use the Nintendo DS's touchscreen to place accessories on their Pokémon to boost a particular trait, such as "Cool" or "Cute", and earn points. In the Dance Competition stage, the player must tap buttons on the touchscreen in rhythm with the music. The final stage, Acting Competition, is similar to Pokémon Contests of the Game Boy Advance games; Pokémon use their moves to appeal to the judges and crowd. Like Pokéblocks in the third-generation games, baked goods called Poffins can be made from berries and fed to Pokémon to boost a particular trait, and therefore, the likelihood of success in a relevant Contest.

=== Connectivity to other devices ===
In addition to compatibility with each other, Diamond and Pearl offer compatibility with the third generation Pokémon games, Pokémon Ruby and Sapphire, Emerald, and FireRed and LeafGreen. They are also compatible with Pokémon Ranger and Pokémon Battle Revolution. After earning the National Pokédex in Diamond and Pearl, the player can "Migrate" Pokémon from the Game Boy Advance games to Diamond and Pearl by inserting a Game Boy Advance cartridge into the Game Boy Advance cartridge slot of the Nintendo DS while Diamond or Pearl is in the DS slot. After six Pokémon are uploaded from the cartridge, they are sent to the Pal Park, an area where the player can capture the transferred Pokémon. (Note: This feature cannot be used on a Nintendo DSi, as the DSi lacks a Game Boy Advance cartridge slot.) Pokémon uploads are restricted to six every twenty-four hours per Game Boy Advance cartridge, and the player must capture the uploaded Pokémon before performing another transfer. Pokémon transferred to Diamond and Pearl this way cannot be sent back to a Game Boy Advance cartridge. After completing a special mission in Pokémon Ranger, the player will be able to send a Manaphy egg or Riolu from Ranger to Diamond or Pearl. Finally, players can wirelessly upload Pokémon from Diamond and Pearl to the Wii games Pokémon Battle Revolution and My Pokémon Ranch.

== Story ==
=== Setting ===
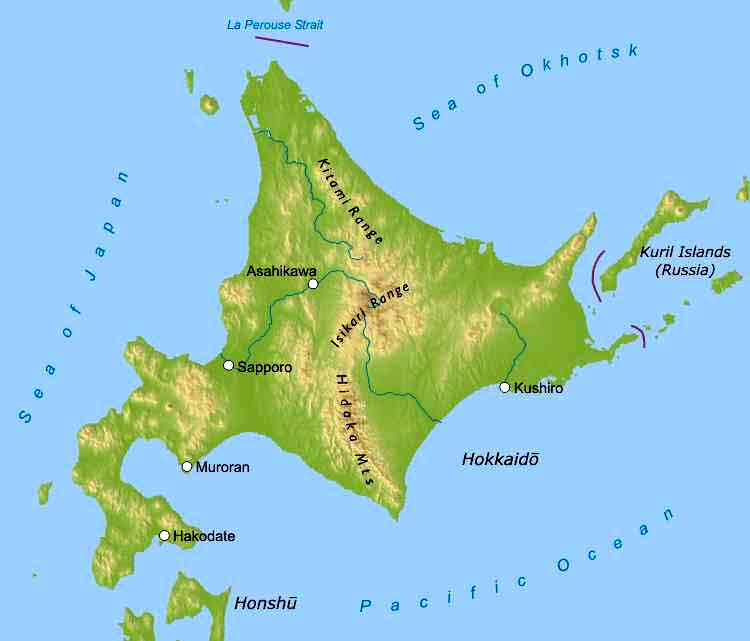
The Sinnoh Region is based on the Japanese island of Hokkaido.

Diamond and Pearl are set in the fictional region of Sinnoh, an island based on the Japanese island of Hokkaido. Sinnoh is not directly connected to any other Pokémon region. It is characterized by large, snow-covered mountains; Mt. Coronet, a part of a mountain range, divides Sinnoh in half. Unlike previous regions, Sinnoh has a "northern" feel to it because it is the first region with snow-covered routes. Sinnoh is also characterized by its waterways with three main lakes, Verity, Acuity, and Valor, that form a triangle. Unlike the Hoenn Region, however, which is mostly water routes, only 30 percent of Sinnoh's landscape comprises waterways. Underneath Sinnoh's surface is the Sinnoh Underground, which is a large maze of caves and tunnels.

=== Plot ===
The games chronicle the adventures of a new Pokémon Trainer who strives to become the Pokémon League Champion by collecting and training Pokémon. Like most games in the series, Diamond and Pearl feature eight Pokémon Gyms led by Gym Leaders, professional Trainers whose expertise lies in a particular Pokémon type. Gym Leaders serve as bosses and reward skilled Trainers with Gym Badges, the key to the advancement of the plot. As with all core games, the protagonist must also thwart the schemes of a crime syndicate, in this case, Team Galactic, who plan to use Pokémon to create a new universe just for themselves, while destroying the current one.

As with all other mainline Pokémon games, Diamond and Pearl begin in the protagonist's hometown. After viewing a television report about a media-conducted search for a red Gyarados, which was spotted at a faraway lake, the protagonist and their best friend, Barry by default, travel together to check the local lake for a Pokémon like it. They spot Professor Rowan, a Pokémon Evolution Researcher, and his assistant, the playable character not selected in the game: Lucas (boy) or Dawn (girl). After a short discussion, the professor and his assistant leave the lake, leaving a briefcase behind. When they are attacked by a wild Starly each, the protagonist and their rival decide to examine the briefcase. They are then given a choice of one of three Pokémon found within—the Grass-type Turtwig, the Fire-type Chimchar, or the Water-type Piplup—and proceed to battle the attacking Pokémon. After defeating the Starly, Lucas or Dawn retrieves and returns the briefcase to the professor. Noticing that a bond has been forged between the young protagonist and his or her chosen Pokémon, Rowan offers it to them, asking that they embark on a journey and fill their Pokédex.

The protagonist encounters the antagonistic group, Team Galactic, early in the game, when he or she must save Professor Rowan from some of their thugs; however, their motives are unclear until later. The player encounters Team Galactic again when they take over a wind farm and when they set up a base in Eterna City, before eventually taking over Sinnoh's three lakes in an attempt to capture the Mirage Pokémon Uxie, Azelf, and Mesprit. Shortly after the player earns their seventh Gym Badge, Team Galactic captures the Mirage Pokémon and imprisons them inside the science laboratory of the Team Galactic Headquarters Building, where its members extract crystals from the Pokémon to create the Red Chain, an object that can control the Legendary Pokémon Palkia in Pearl, or Dialga in Diamond. After releasing the trio, the protagonist can access the Spear Pillar, an ancient ruin atop Mt. Coronet, where the leader of Team Galactic summons Dialga or Palkia. The Legendary Pokémon's powers begin to overwhelm Sinnoh, causing the newly free Uxie, Azelf, and Mesprit to attempt to stop it. The player then battles Palkia or Dialga, and after defeating or capturing the Pokémon, Sinnoh returns to normal. Afterward, the player continues their journey, eventually reaching the Sinnoh League. After defeating all Elite Four members, they battle the Sinnoh League Champion, a blonded woman named Cynthia, who had appeared before in the game. After the protagonist defeats Cynthia, they become the new Sinnoh League Champion, finishing the main story. In the post-game, a new island to explore contains Pokémon not seen in the main game and has some new stores and a tournament center. The protagonist's old friend, who challenged them to battles multiple times before, will also be waiting for them here and will challenge them to one more battle.

== Development ==
Pokémon Diamond and Pearl were developed by Game Freak and Junichi Masuda served as game director. The game's music was scored by Hitomi Sato and Junichi Masuda under the supervision of Go Ichinose, with a few other fanfares composed by Morikazu Aoki. According to The Pokémon Company's Tsunekazu Ishihara, the games were designed with the DS's unique features in mind, such as the Wi-Fi capabilities and slot for Game Boy Advance cartridges. The command buttons in the battle screen are large and color-coded; according to Masuda, this feature would facilitate gameplay for players unable to read. Also, the touchscreen interface was designed to encourage players to use their fingers rather than the stylus to manipulate the screen. Though most of the graphics in Diamond and Pearl are 2D, some of the background elements are 3D. The decision to retain 2D graphics in Diamond and Pearl drew criticism; in response, Tsunekazu Ishihara said that "we wanted to maintain the original idea of Pokémon being a game that you played on this big map" and explained that physically, the games were in three dimensions but was designed to "maintain the original feel of the game". Responding to criticism over the use of Friend Codes in the games, Ishihara explained that it was a security measure taken to ensure that players would not be able to chat with strangers over the Wi-Fi connection. Nintendo released a statement detailing glitches found in Japanese releases of Diamond and Pearl. The glitches caused players to be stuck in an in-game wall or lose saved data. Nintendo released patches to certain retailers in Japan to fix these glitches.

In mid 2020, dataminers leaked the source code for Diamond and Pearl, revealing a collection of unused sprites and scrapped designs for new Pokémon. They were first leaked onto ResetEra, and were part of a series of Nintendo-related leaks of unfinished builds of games in development.

== Release ==
Development of Pokémon Diamond and Pearl was announced at a Nintendo press conference in the fourth calendar quarter of 2004 alongside the reveal of Pokémon Dash and details on the Japanese launch of the Nintendo DS. Masuda stated it would "become a new type of game that offers a number of new forms of play" and that he was determined to create "the ultimate [Pokémon] version". Though Diamond and Pearl were expected to be released in Japan by 2005, Nintendo revealed that the developers were still working on aspects of the gameplay and that the games would not be released until 2006. The company said that Diamond and Pearl would be able to communicate with Pokémon games for the Game Boy Advance, allowing players to transfer their Pokémon to the new games. Nintendo also announced that the games would make full use of the Wi-Fi capabilities of the DS, allowing 16 players to communicate wirelessly at one time. Further information concerning the games was not released until mid-2006, when Nintendo President Satoru Iwata mentioned that connectivity with Pokémon Battle Revolution was also still in development; new features such as the Pokétch and time sensitivity were also mentioned.

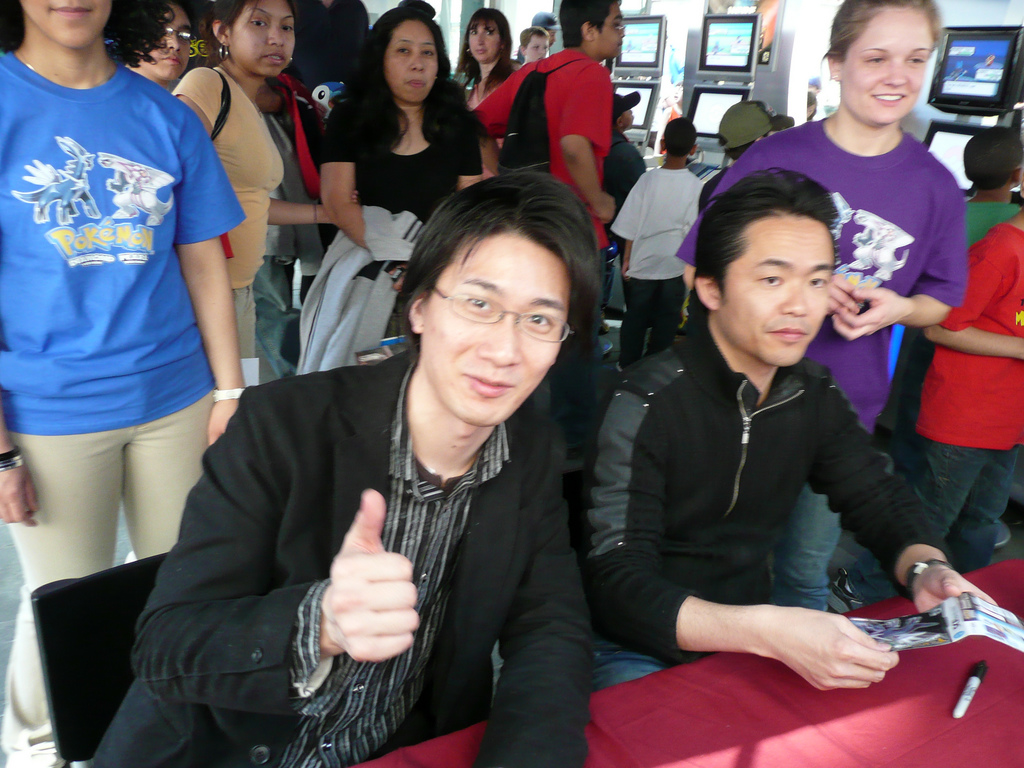
Director Junichi Masuda (right) and designer Shigeru Ohmori (left) at the North American release party in New York City

The games were released in Japan on September 28, 2006. To commemorate the release, Nintendo sold a limited-edition DS Lite in Japanese Pokémon Center stores and through the Pokémon fan club by mail. The console featured the games' mascots Dialga and Palkia painted in silver and gold respectively on a metallic black finish. A two-disc soundtrack, Nintendo DS Pokémon Diamond & Pearl Super Music Collection, was also released in Japan on December 22, 2006. It peaked at #253 on Japan's Oricon charts and charted for one week. On December 20, 2006, Nintendo of America announced that the North American release of the games was slated for April 22, 2007, and that those who pre-ordered their copies of the games would receive special DS styluses branded with some of the new Pokémon. Shortly before the games' North American release, The Pokémon Company presented a limited demo of the games for Nintendo's booth at the Game Developer's Conference. To celebrate the games' North American release, Nintendo held a release party at the Nintendo World Store in New York City's Rockefeller Plaza. Nintendo of Europe announced a release date of July 27, 2007, for the European Union, and Nintendo Australia announced a June 21 release date. A launch event was held in GAME stores at Hamleys to celebrate the European release of the games. The event, held on July 26, 2007, offered a chance to purchase the games one day before their official release date and featured an appearance by band McFly. To celebrate the Australian release of the games, Nintendo launched the nationwide Nintendo DS Connection Tour 07; each stop in the tour featured events such as Pokémon Trading Card Game competitions and Pokémon trivia games.

The success of the games revived the popularity of the Pokémon brand. George Harrison, then Nintendo of America's vice president of marketing, noted that the games were attracting "players of all ages"—from younger children to "grown men and women" and older players who "played the original Pokémon games". As a result, Pokémon USA opened a temporary boutique in the Times Square Toys "R" Us that sold exclusively Pokémon licensed merchandise including Jakks Pacific-created action figures, plush toys, backpacks, and clothing. Ronald Boire, president of Toys "R" Us, stated that the store planned to open temporary boutiques in all 585 of its domestic locations. Other Pokémon merchandise included a BattleDome Playset and a talking Pokédex. Additionally, Pokémon USA partnered with Burger King in 2008 to launch a promotional campaign in which Burger King included exclusive Pokémon trading cards and accessories with Kids Meals. The promotion lasted from July 7 to August 3 in the United States and continued through the fall internationally.

=== Pokémon Platinum ===
Pokémon Platinum Version (Note: Japanese: ポケットモンスタープラチナ, Hepburn: Poketto Monsutā Purachina; "Pocket Monsters: Platinum") is the third version after Pokémon Diamond and Pearl developed by Game Freak and published by The Pokémon Company and Nintendo for the Nintendo DS handheld game console. It was released on September 13, 2008, in Japan, March 22, 2009, in North America, May 14, 2009, in Australia, and May 22, 2009, in Europe.

Pokémon Platinum has been met with generally positive reception, holding aggregate scores of 84 and 83.14% at Metacritic and GameRankings respectively. It was praised for the additions and changes made to Diamond and Pearl by publications such as IGN, Nintendo Power, and GamePro, though it has been criticized for being too similar to them. IGN included it as the ninth-best Nintendo DS game ever made, as well as nominating it as one of the best DS role-playing games of 2009. It was the fastest-selling game in Japan at the time, shifting 7.6 million copies overall.

== Reception ==
Reception

Aggregate score
Aggregator	Score
Metacritic	85/100

Review scores
Publication	Score
1Up.com	A−
Computer and Video Games	8.1/10
Eurogamer	9/10
Famitsu	35/40
GameSpot	8.5/10 (Pearl)
GameSpy	7.5/10 (Pearl)
GameZone	8.5/10 (Pearl)
IGN	8.5/10 (Diamond)
Nintendo Power	9/10

Pokémon Diamond and Pearl garnered slightly higher ratings than FireRed and LeafGreen and Ruby and Sapphire. The highest score given was a 92 by UK Official Nintendo Magazine, while the lowest was a 67 by Game Revolution. Official Nintendo Magazine would later go on to rank the game 20th in a list of the greatest Nintendo games. Ryan Davis of GameSpot gave the games an 8.5/10, "Great", and called the games "the most well-rounded Pokémon games to date." IGN and GameZone also gave the games an 8.5/10. The UK Official Nintendo Magazine gave the games 92%, and GameSpy gave them a 4.5/5. The games received slightly lower reviews from ComputerAndVideoGames.com than Ruby and Sapphire had, but earned an "A−" grade from 1UP.com, an improvement from Ruby and Sapphire's "B−".

Most reviewers felt that though the gameplay and storyline had not changed much since the first games, Diamond and Pearl were still engaging. Davis said, "[I]t's a little surprising how well the formula holds up in Diamond and Pearl, which is a testament to the strong fundamentals of the series as well as the quality of the execution." The games' Wi-Fi connectivity also earned largely positive reviews. 1UP.com called the addition of wireless connectivity the games' "biggest improvements". GameSpot and GameSpy both listed the addition of online play as one of the positive points of the games and called the system "robust" and "probably the most significant new feature." ComputerAndVideoGames.com said of the Global Trade Center, "Suddenly, Pokémon feels properly alive for the first time since playgrounds were abuzz with monsters in the late '90s – and you'll instantly forgive Game Freak their technical stubbornness the first time you switch on your DS and find the level 100 Munchlax you craved is on your cart."

The graphics generally received positive reviews. GameSpot praised the blend of 2D and 3D graphics, and GameZone said that the graphics were "better than what I had originally imagined" and that "a Pokemon title hasn't ever looked this good on a handheld." GameSpy felt that the graphics, though simple, made the game "a pleasure to explore". ComputerAndVideoGames.com, however, said that "the so-called '3D' isn't up to much: it's just a viewpoint shuffle, with DS's gutsy engine taking a nice long nap between the odd hypnotic windfarm or fog effect." The audio was not so well-received: IGN felt that the cries made by the Pokémon "still screech with the flair of the original Game Boy" and that the music, while "more advanced", was "not much beyond [Game Boy Advance] quality". GameZone also felt that the sounds had not been updated, saying "This [the audio] is the only area that hasn't taken one step forward. It remains stagnant and doesn't show any progression over the GBA titles". GameSpot cited the games' "recycled" sounds as one of the negative points.

=== Sales ===
First released in Japan in 2006, Pokémon Diamond and Pearl have the most successful launch week of games in the Pokémon series, and the best launch week for any Nintendo DS game for the country alone. Within forty-six days, the games sold three million units, becoming the fastest DS games to do so; by the end of the year, the number increased to five million units in just under three months, making Diamond and Pearl the best-selling Pokémon games in Japan. In the United States, pre-orders for Diamond and Pearl passed 533,000, almost twice the pre-sale numbers for FireRed and LeafGreen. Within five days of release, the games sold around one million copies and were the fastest-selling Pokémon games ever until the release of Pokémon Platinum. The games were the seventh-best-selling video games of 2007, with around 4.27 million units sold in the United States; in early 2009 sales passed 5.3 million units. As of September 30, 2017, Pokémon Diamond and Pearl combined have sold 17.67 million copies worldwide, making their sales totals around one million higher than those of Ruby and Sapphire and around six million higher than those of FireRed and LeafGreen. The games also boosted sales of hardware in the United States, spurring the sales of 471,000 DS units and causing the sales of video games in April 2007 to rise 20% from April 2006. In Europe, the games sold around 1.6 million units within just seven weeks of their release and topped the charts in Spain, Germany, and the United Kingdom. Additionally, there have been more than 10 million Pokémon trades via Wi-Fi.

=== Awards ===
At G4's G-phoria 2007, the games won "Best Handheld Game", and were nominated for "Best RPG". In 2008 Pokémon Diamond and Pearl were nominated for the British Academy of Film and Television Arts Children's Kids Vote Award. In IGN's Best of 2007 Awards, Diamond and Pearl were named the best Nintendo DS online multiplayer games and the best Nintendo DS RPG games of the year. In the 2006 Famitsu Game Awards, Diamond and Pearl won the Best Hit award and tied with Final Fantasy XII for the Game of the Year award.

Competitive battling in Pokémon became much more popular with Diamond and Pearl. The physical special split allowed Pokémon such as Gengar and Gyarados to use their higher attacking stat and gave special/physical coverage moves to formerly all-physical/special types, and online play made Pokémon battling possible all over the world.

== Legacy ==
=== Remakes and prequel ===
Pokémon Brilliant Diamond and Shining Pearl are enhanced remakes of the games and were released for the Nintendo Switch on November 19, 2021. Pokémon Legends: Arceus is an action role-playing game which serves as a prequel to Diamond and Pearl and is set in an older version of the Sinnoh region known as the Hisui region. It was released for the Nintendo Switch on January 28, 2022. Both games were initially revealed in a Pokémon Presents presentation on February 26, 2021.

Brilliant Diamond and Shining Pearl were produced by ILCA, and acted as "faithful" remakes to Diamond and Pearl, with the addition of game mechanics introduced in later titles. The games were released to "mixed" or average reviews, with positivity being directed towards its faithful nature, and criticism towards the lack of Pokémon Platinum features and how the game handled newer features being meshed with older ones. Additionally, its graphics art-style, which made characters in the overworld resemble "chibis" received mixed responses from critics. As of May 2022, the games had sold over fourteen million copies.

Pokémon Legends: Arceus, while maintaining core gameplay mechanics, changed how the overworld was traversed, with players being able to freely explore five different areas or "biomes" of Hisui. Players can actively interact with Pokémon in the overworld, with hostile Pokémon capable of attacking and injuring the player character. Players can engage with Pokémon in battle from the overworld. The game received "generally favorable reviews" from critics, with many praising the new gameplay style and direction, with criticism being directed towards the game's art-style. The game was nominated for Best RPG at The Game Awards. By May 2022, the game had shifted over twelve million copies.

=== Related games ===
Pokémon Battle Revolution (Note: Japanese: ポケモンバトルレボリューション, Hepburn: Pokémon Batoru Reboryūshon) is the first Wii incarnation of the Pokémon video game franchise. The game uses wireless connection in order to connect to the Nintendo DS, allowing players to use their Pokémon from Diamond and Pearl in the game's various modes.

My Pokémon Ranch (Note: Japanese: みんなのポケモン牧場, Hepburn: Minna no Pokemon Bokujō; Everyone's Pokémon Ranch) is a Wii game developed by Ambrella and released via the WiiWare download service. First released on March 25, 2008, in Japan, it was later made available in North America on June 9, 2008, and in Europe on July 4, 2008, for 1,000 Wii Points, equivalent to US$10.00. Like the GameCube's Pokémon Box: Ruby and Sapphire, Pokémon Ranch allows players to store and arrange Pokémon from Diamond and Pearl. Pokémon transferred from those games to My Pokémon Ranch are rendered in 3D and can interact with the player's Miis.
