= Tomo Sakurai =

Japanese actress and singer (1971–2025)

- 櫻井 智
- Born: Tomoe Hatta (八田 友江); September 10, 1971; Chiba Prefecture, Japan
- Died: August 13, 2025 (aged 53)
- Other names: Akira-chan (智ちゃん); Tomo (トモ)
- Occupations: Actress; voice actress; singer
- Years active: 1993–2000, 2005–2016, 2019–2025
- Agent: Feathered
- Height: 159.6 cm (5 ft 3 in)
- Spouse: Office worker (m. 1999–2025)
- Children: 1

Tomoe Hatta (Japanese: 八田 友江, Hepburn: Hatta Tomoe; September 10, 1971 – August 13, 2025), known professionally as Tomo Sakurai (櫻井 智, Sakurai Tomo), was a Japanese actress and singer. Originally part of the idol trio Lemon Angel, she started her voice acting career in the 1990s, starring as Mylene Flare Jenius in Macross 7, Meimi Haneoka in Saint Tail, Makimachi Misao in Rurouni Kenshin, the titular character of Super Doll Licca-chan, and Cynthia in all Pokémon animated entries since Pokémon the Series: Diamond and Pearl. She briefly came out of retirement during the last few years of her life, voicing Kaede in the 2024 anime Grandpa and Grandma Turn Young Again.

== Biography ==
=== Early life and career ===
Tomoe Hatta, a native of Chiba Prefecture, was born on September 10, 1971, the youngest of four children. She graduated from Hinode Girls' High School.

She became interested in "standing on stage" after seeing a musical Shonentai was performing in while in junior high school, and she applied for three auditions she saw in advertisements on Monthly Deview. Having seen that her three older sisters begged their parents to let them fulfill their entertainment industry ambitions but were opposed, she auditioned without telling her parents. She passed all three auditions she applied to and joined L Staff Promotion, the first to contact her.

After working as a mascot girl for Kijima's KISS Racing Team, Sakurai debuted in 1987 as a member of the idol group Lemon Angel with Miki Emoto and Erika Shima. The group disbanded in 1990.

=== Voice acting career ===
In 1993, Sakurai made her official voice acting debut in the anime Dragon League. In 1994, she started voicing Mylene Flare Jenius in Macross 7, reprising the role in other anime projects and associated musical works. In 1995, she starred as Meimi Haneoka, the titular protagonist of Saint Tail. She also starred as Sulia Gaudeamus in Fatal Fury: The Motion Picture (1994), Makimachi Misao in Rurouni Kenshin (1996), and the titular character of Super Doll Licca-chan (1998), and she voiced Marin in Akazukin Chacha (1994) and Shayla Shayla in El-Hazard (1995). She was known for being a pioneer of the multimedia "idol voice actor" around that decade, with Mikikazu Komatsu of Crunchyroll News citing her as a "successful [example] of a transition from idol to voice actor".

In the 2000s and 2010s, Sakurai voiced Chigusa Sakai in Shakugan no Shana (2005–2011), Azusa Miura in Idolmaster: Xenoglossia (2007), Cynthia in Pokémon (2007–2022), and Hinowa in Gintama (2009–2015).

=== Non-voice acting career ===
Sakurai's 1995 Macross 7 album Milene Jenius Sings Lynn Minmay charted at #9 at the Oricon Albums Chart. She released two albums with Victor Entertainment: T-mode (1995; #39) and Cherry (1996; #26). She released another album with Pony Canyon, L.A.Early (1996; #44), as well as two best-of albums with Pioneer LDC: Actress (1996; #33) and Actress II (1997; #42).

Sakurai made her stage debut as Judy in a 1991 performance in Daddy Long Legs and played Beth in a 1992 production of Little Women, performing at 39 locations across Japan. She was part of the Kaoru Asakura Theater Company. She also starred in a musical adaptation of Saint Tail.

In June 1999, Sakurai married an office worker who was in her junior high school dating group; they had lost contact after she went to a different high school but reunited while visiting a summer festival at their native Ichikawa. Their daughter was born in July 2000. The existence of the marriage and child were not disclosed until 2001 for privacy.

Sakurai released a semi-nude photo book titled Ripple in April 2000. She was five months pregnant at the time of the photoshoot, with her pregnant belly concealed in the photobook. The photo book's nature as "a memento of her pregnancy" was not disclosed at the time, and fans were repeatedly complaining about its semi-nude nature.

=== Later life and death ===
On September 1, 2016, Sakurai announced her retirement from professional voice acting, citing growing difficulties with the job due to aging. However, she announced her return to the entertainment industry in May 2019, appearing in Fafner in the Azure: The Beyond and Kabaneri of the Iron Fortress: The Battle of Unato that same month. Originally part of I'm Enterprise from 2009 to 2014, she joined the agency Feathered in June 2022. She reprised her role as Cynthia in Pokémon Master Journeys: The Series (2020–2021), and she starred as Kaede in the 2024 anime Grandpa and Grandma Turn Young Again. In May 2024, she held an autographing session at Quincy Country Club in Quincy, Illinois.

In August 2023, Sakurai was diagnosed with pancreatic cancer and informed she had a year to live, subsequently undergoing treatment for her illness. On August 10, 2025, she announced that she had been hospitalized a week prior and that her planned August 17 concert at Shibuya, Tokyo would be cancelled. While at the hospital, her condition worsened and three days later on August 13, she died at the age of 53, due to complications from multiple organ cancer. Her death was announced by her agency two days later.

A funeral with only close relatives has been planned, as well as a public farewell event.

== Filmography ==
=== Television animation ===
- Cream Lemon: Lemon Angel (1987), Tomo
- Akazukin Chacha (1994), Marin
- Macross 7 (1994), Mylene Jenius
- El-Hazard (1995), Shayla Shayla
- Saint Tail (1995), Meimi Haneoka/Saint Tail
- Rurouni Kenshin (1996), Makimachi Misao
- Super Doll Licca-chan (1998), Doll Licca
- Shakugan no Shana (2005), Chigusa Sakai
- My-Otome (2005), Lena Sayers
- Yu-Gi-Oh! Duel Monsters GX (2006), Mizuchi Saio
- Idolmaster: Xenoglossia (2007), Azusa Miura
- Pocket Monsters: Diamond & Pearl (2007), Cynthia/Shirona
- Gintama (2009), Hinowa
- The World God Only Knows (2010), Asuka Sora
- Kuromajo-san ga Toru!! (2012), Choco's Mother
- Pocket Monsters (2021), Yoshino, Cynthia/Shirona
- Grandpa and Grandma Turn Young Again (2024), Kaede

=== Theatrical animation ===
- Fatal Fury: The Motion Picture (1994), Sulia Gaudeamus
- Doraemon: The New Record of Nobita's Spaceblazer (2009), Roppuru

=== Original video animation ===
- Rurouni Kenshin: New Kyoto Arc (2011), Makimachi Misao

=== Video games ===
- Samurai Shodown III (1995), Rimururu
- The Super Dimension Fortress Macross (2003), Emma Granger
- Phantom Brave: The Lost Hero (2025), Mayfair

=== Audio drama ===
- Rurouni Kenshin (1994), Kamiya Kaoru

=== Dubbing ===
==== Live-action ====
- Admission, Portia Nathan (Tina Fey)
- The City of Your Final Destination, Arden Langdon (Charlotte Gainsbourg)
- Dragon Blade, Parthian Queen (Lorie Pester)
- The Monkey King, Chang'e (Gigi Leung)
- The Taking of Tiger Mountain, Ma Qinglian (Yu Nan)
- Third Person, Julia Weiss (Mila Kunis)
- Vivarium, Gemma (Imogen Poots)
- Young Detective Dee: Rise of the Sea Dragon, Yin Ruiji (Angelababy)

==== Animation ====
- Robinson Crusoe, Kiki
