= Pokémon: Arceus and the Jewel of Life =

2009 film by Kunihiko Yuyama

- Theatrical release poster

Japanese name
- Kanji: 劇場版ポケットモンスター ダイヤモンド&パールアルセウス 超克の時空へ
Transcriptions
- Romanization: Gekijō-ban Pokettomonsutā Daiyamondo ando Pāru Aruseusu Chōkoku no Jikū he
- Directed by: Kunihiko Yuyama
- Screenplay by: Hideki Sonoda
- Based on: Pokémon: Diamond and Pearl by: Satoshi Tajiri; Junichi Masuda; Ken Sugimori
- Produced by: Takemoto Mori; Junya Okamoto; Mikihiko Fukazawa; Chōji Yoshikawa
- Starring: see below
- Cinematography: Takaya Mizutani
- Edited by: Toshio Henmi
- Music by: Shinji Miyazaki
- Production companies: OLM, Inc. OLM Digital
- Distributed by: Toho
- Release date: July 18, 2009 (Japan)
- Running time: 94 minutes
- Country: Japan
- Language: Japanese
- Box office: ¥4.67 billion

Pokémon: Arceus and the Jewel of Life (Note: Japanese: 劇場版ポケットモンスター ダイヤモンド&パール アルセウス 超克の時空へ, Hepburn: Gekijō-ban Pokettomonsutā Daiyamondo ando Pāru Aruseusu Chōkoku no Jikū he; lit. "Pocket Monsters Diamond & Pearl the Movie: Arceus: To Conquering Space-Time") is a 2009 Japanese animated adventure film produced by OLM, Inc. and distributed by Toho. The film was directed by Kunihiko Yuyama from a screenplay by Hideki Sonoda. It is the twelfth film in the Pokémon anime series and the third film of Pokémon the Series: Diamond and Pearl, created by Satoshi Tajiri, Junichi Masuda and Ken Sugimori, serving as a direct sequel to Pokémon: Giratina & the Sky Warrior (2008). It was released in Japan on July 18, 2009.

In the film, Arceus, a powerful creature known as a Pokémon, awakens from a long slumber to seek justice on the humans that refused to return Arceus its life-giving jewel and attacked it. Through loop quantum cosmology, the spacial distortions caused by Arceus's awakening leads to the conflict between the extradimensional Pokémon Dialga, Palkia, and Giratina. To prevent Arceus from attacking humanity, Dialga sends Pokémon trainers Ash Ketchum, Dawn, and Brock back in time, along with Sheena, a descendant of the man mistakenly believed to have betrayed Arceus.

The theme song of the film is "Kokoro no Antenna" by Shoko Nakagawa.

== Plot ==
Thousands of years ago, Arceus, a Pokémon believed to have created entire worlds, saved this world (Note: Referred to as the world of reality or the real world in the 2008 film Pokémon: Giratina & the Sky Warrior to distinguish itself from Dialga, Palkia, and Giratina's dimensions.) from a meteor storm and nearly died with the loss of its sixteen Life Plates. Arceus was saved by a man named Damos, from the wasteland town of Michina, when he returned the plates to Arceus. Feeling pity for the town and in an act of gratitude, Arceus fused five of its plates into the Jewel of Life, which made the land rich and fertile. Arceus asked Damos to return the jewel to it, but Damos, hypnotized by a Bronzong belonging to Damos' lieutenant Marcus, betrayed Arceus and attacked it, as Marcus believed the town would again become a wasteland. Arceus destroyed the temple which was built as a shrine dedicated to it and was forced to go into a long slumber. Arceus intended to judge humanity when it awakened.

When Arceus began to awaken, massive whirlpools of energy formed around it. These distortions brought together the dimensions of two Pokémon that should never have met: Dialga, which rules time, and Palkia, which rules space. Dialga and Palkia then collided with one another in Alamos Town, (Note: As depicted in the 2007 film Pokémon: The Rise of Darkrai.) both mistakenly assuming the other had threatened their territory. This battle affected the Reverse World, the dimension ruled by the Pokémon Giratina, bringing them into the conflict. (Note: As depicted in the 2008 film Pokémon: Giratina & the Sky Warrior.)

In the present, Pokémon trainers Ash Ketchum, Dawn, and Brock arrive at a lake near the ruined temple. A whirlpool strikes up, threatening the lives of Ash's Pikachu and Dawn's Piplup. Sheena, a descendant of Damos who has been investigating the disruptions in time and space, summons Dialga, who saves Pikachu and Piplup. Giratina then arrives, but Ash, who Giratina remembers from their previous encounter, calms its rage. Sheena believes that Pikachu and Ash are the thunder creature and its master from legend, said to have changed the fate of the town long ago. Palkia arrives to save Dialga from another whirlpool, before the two return to their own dimensions.

Arceus then emerges; Sheena offers it the Jewel of Life to calm its wrath, only to discover that the jewel is a fake. Dialga, Palkia, and Giratina return to stop Arceus from destroying humanity. Dialga sends Ash, Dawn, Brock, and Sheena back in time to the day when Damos was manipulated into betraying Arceus, where Damos and Marcus fall to their deaths in the collapsing temple. Upon Sheena's request, Dialga sends her and the others further back.

Unaware of Marcus's true role, Sheena tells him everything about the future. Arceus arrives to collect the Jewel of Life from Marcus' scepter, but Sheena is fooled into betraying Arceus when the scepter is empty. Arceus is forced into a pit and is wounded by silver water and electrical attacks, which Arceus became vulnerable to after it gave Damos the jewel. Marcus' intention is to kill Arceus himself to save the future. Sheena and Damos use their abilities to communicate with the other Pokémon to stop the Pokémon under Marcus' control from electrocuting Arceus.

Ash obtains the Jewel of Life, and calmed by Damos' ability, Arceus absorbs the jewel, restoring its own life force, and reversing the time paradox that nearly killed Ash, Dawn, Brock, Sheena, and their Pokémon. Arceus rescues the people and Pokémon from the collapse of the temple. Ash, Dawn, Brock, and Sheena are transported back to the present, only to discover that Arceus is still furious and has defeated Dialga, Palkia, and Giratina. Arceus spots Ash and recognizes him due to history's alterations, and reverses the destruction it caused, healing its former adversaries. Ash and the others discover Damos has put them on a mural, thanking them for their help in saving the world and seeing that even without the Jewel of Life, Michina is still fertile due to the people and Pokémon cultivating the land. Dialga, Palkia, Giratina, and Arceus depart for their dimensions, with Arceus realizing that it is truly a part of this world.

== Cast ==
Character	Japanese	English
Ash Ketchum	Rica Matsumoto	Sarah Natochenny
Pikachu	Ikue Otani	Ikue Otani
Dawn	Megumi Toyoguchi	Emily Bauer
Brock	Yūji Ueda	Bill Rogers
Narrator	Unshō Ishizuka	Rodger Parsons
Jessie	Megumi Hayashibara	Michele Knotz
James	Shin-ichiro Miki	James Carter Cathcart
Meowth	Inuko Inuyama	James Carter Cathcart
Piplup	Etsuko Kozakura	Michele Knotz
Damos	Masahiro Takashima	Dan Green
Sheena	Kii Kitano	Carrie Keranen
Kevin	Yūji Kishi	Wayne Grayson
Marcus	Kōichi Yamadera	Jason Griffith
Arceus	Akihiro Miwa	Tom Wayland
Pichu	Shoko Nakagawa	Kayzie Rogers
Tapp	Yuzuru Fujimoto	Bill Tost
Kato	Motoko Kumai	Tom Wayland
Kiko	Kei Shindō	Erica Schroeder
Heatran	Kenta Miyake	Tom Wayland

== Production ==
The film's director, Kunihiko Yuyama, stated that in the film Arceus was depicted as being nature, the Jewel of Life as being the Sun, with the end goal of making people contemplate how the natural world is essential for the survival of all life. In Japan, the movie was distributed by Toho, best known for creating Godzilla. The movie's fictitious setting is based on the Acropolis, Mycenae, Delphi, and the Metéora in Greece, which the director and producers visited in August 2008.

== Release ==
=== Theatrical run ===
The film was released in Japanese theaters on July 18, 2009, opening at #4 in its first weekend, behind the Japanese release of Harry Potter and the Half-Blood Prince (#2) and Kamen Rider Decade: All Riders vs. Dai-Shocker (#1). It became the ninth highest grossing animated film of that year.

=== Broadcast airing ===
In the United States, the English dub aired on Cartoon Network on November 20, 2009. This marks the first time that a Pokémon feature film has made its U.S. debut in the same year as its original Japanese release.

=== Home media ===
A Blu-ray released on December 13, 2021, in the UK.

== Reception ==
Pokemon: Arceus and the Jewel of Life generally got mixed reviews.

Carl Kimlinger, writing for Anime News Network, gave the film an overall grade of B−. He noted the film's similarity to previous Pokémon films, saying: "It is totally inoffensive, reliably entertaining, and completely forgettable. In short, the exact same thing Pokémon movies have been", and added: "Whether that sounds like a promise or a threat to you will determine whether this is something you want to watch." He praised the film's special effects, saying: "The sheer beauty of the film will come as a surprise to even the healthiest, best-watched Pokémon fan out there", but criticized the character designs as "bargain-basement", saying: "the contrast between the television series' two-dimensional designs, with their simple eyes and spiky cliché-hair, and the film's fully-realized three-dimensional world is jarring." Kimlinger concluded: "It's harmless, so long as you discount the gotta-catch-'em-all commercialism and occasional weird polytheistic undercurrent, and has some laudable things to say about the power of the human will to better the world", and recommended Kiki's Delivery Service as a better alternative.

Film Music Central gave it a positive review saying that "Arceus and the Jewel of Life is definitely one of the better films in the series, and it caps off an excellent story arc" and "Definitely watch this one if you get the chance (but make sure you watch the others first for full effect)" HeyUGuys gave it a negative review saying that "This will not appeal to those who once loved the anime television series or those who really love their anime films and it is no surprise that it may, most likely, not see a release in the UK".
