= Arceus =

Pokémon species

- Pokémon character
- Arceus artwork by Ken Sugimori
- First game: Pokémon Diamond and Pearl (2006)
- Created by: Takao Unno

In-universe information
- Species: Pokémon
- Type: Normal (Note: While Arceus is Normal type by default, it is capable of being any type through the use of special items.)

Arceus (/ˈɑːrkiːəs/; Japanese: アルセウス, Hepburn: Aruseusu) is a Pokémon species in Nintendo and Game Freak's Pokémon media franchise, first introduced in the 2006 video games Pokémon Diamond and Pearl and designed by Takao Unno. Despite being featured in Diamond and Pearl, it was not available through official means, instead available through promotional events. It was not obtainable in game until the 2021 remakes Pokémon Brilliant Diamond and Shining Pearl. It is a central figure in the game Pokémon Legends: Arceus, where it sends the protagonist back in time to meet all Pokémon. Since Arceus's debut, it has appeared in multiple games including the Pokémon Trading Card Game, as well as various merchandise.

Classified as a Normal-type Pokémon, Arceus is said to be the god of Pokémon, who is claimed to be responsible for the creation of the universe, as well as the Pokémon Dialga, Palkia, and Giratina, which are responsible for time, space, and anti-matter respectively. It is capable of changing to any other type through the use of items called "Plates". It has a white and grey body with a gold circle around its body, its colors changing depending on its type. It is the central figure of the film Pokémon: Arceus and the Jewel of Life.

== Concept and design ==
Arceus is a species of fictional creatures called Pokémon created for the Pokémon media franchise. Developed by Game Freak and published by Nintendo, the Japanese franchise began in 1996 with the video games Pokémon Red and Green for the Game Boy, which were later released in North America as Pokémon Red and Blue in 1998. In these games and their sequels, the player assumes the role of a Trainer whose goal is to capture and use the creatures' special abilities to combat other Pokémon. Some Pokémon can transform into stronger species through a process called evolution via various means, such as exposure to specific items. Each Pokémon has one or two elemental types, which define its advantages and disadvantages when battling other Pokémon. A major goal in each game is to complete the Pokédex, a comprehensive Pokémon encyclopedia, by capturing, evolving, and trading with other Trainers to obtain individuals from all Pokémon species. A 2022 leak revealed that during the beta of Pokémon Diamond and Pearl, it had a significantly different and simpler design.

Arceus is the god of Pokémon, said to have originally been an egg "in a place where there was nothing" before creating the world. It is described in-game as predating the universe and that it is responsible for creating it using its "1,000 arms". Arceus also created three other Pokémon: Dialga, the master of time, Palkia, the master of space, and Giratina, the master of antimatter. It later banished Giratina to the Distortion World for its violent disposition, causing it to be stricken from records as well as Giratina itself developing a strong grudge against its creator. It is also responsible for the creation of Uxie, Mesprit, and Azelf, which represent knowledge, emotion, and willpower respectively. It is among the most powerful Pokémon, exceeding the next best Pokémon by 20 percent in its battle statistics at the time of its debut. While it is Normal type by default, it is capable of becoming any Pokémon type through the use of items called "Plates", each plate corresponding to a different type. There are 19 total Plates; 16 were introduced initially, with a 17th Plate being introduced with the introduction of the Fairy type in Pokémon X and Y, and the Blank Plate and Legend Plate being introduced in Pokémon Legends: Arceus. It has the signature move "Judgment", which changes type depending on which type Arceus is. Arceus is a quadrupedal Pokémon. Its body is primarily white and grey, with a gold wheel adorned with four green jewels and gold hooves. Its head extends into a flowing mane, and it has a horse-like design and mannerisms. While it uses this color scheme by default, it changes depending on the Plate equipped. It has a Shiny form, a rare variant for each Pokémon. In this case, the white is changed to gold. However, in Legends: Arceus it is "shiny-locked" meaning the shiny variety can not be obtained through legitimate methods.

The pronunciation of its name has been the subject of debate due in part to the pronunciation differences between English and Japanese. In English, it is pronounced "ar-key-us" (/ˈɑːɹkiːəs/), while Japanese pronounces it as ""ar-say-us" (/ˈɑːɹseɪəs/). The voice director for the anime film. Pokémon: Arceus and the Jewel of Life, stated that they chose to use a hard c sound to avoid its name sounding like "arse". Despite this split, it is called Arceus with a soft c in the Detective Pikachu film. Arceus was also referred to with a soft c sound earlier in the Pokémon TV series.

== Appearances ==
=== In the games ===
Arceus first appears in Pokémon Diamond and Pearl, though it was not officially revealed at the time. It could be found in an area called the "Hall of Origin", which was legitimately accessible only through the use of an item called an "Azure Flute", an event-exclusive item that was never distributed at the time. The item was only ever accessible in these games through workarounds. Another workaround involved manipulating the game to glitch into finding and catching Arceus. Despite the Azure Flute never being distributed, Arceus itself was distributed to promote Pokémon: Arceus and the Jewel of Life. It was later announced to be featured in an in-game event Pokémon HeartGold and SoulSilver, remakes of the games Pokémon Gold and Silver. The event centers around the player character being transported from the Ruins of Alph to the Sinjoh Ruins located to the north of the Johto region by the combined powers of the Unown and the Arceus in their possession, meeting with Sinnoh's champion Cynthia who presents them with the opportunity to have their Arceus create one of either Dialga, Palkia, or Giratina, before returning to the Ruins of Alph with their chosen Legendary Pokémon. A subsequent return trip with an Arceus from the Hall of Origin to the Sinjoh Ruins was also programmed into the game in which Cynthia returned home to Sinnoh and the player being able to choose a second Legendary Pokémon they have not already received, but due to the Azure Flute not being officially distributed in Diamond and Pearl or Pokémon Platinum, this event went unused.

As a result of players voting on Pokémon Dream World for which Pokémon would be distributed, Arceus was chosen, and players of Pokémon Black and White were given a code to add it to their copies, except for players in South Korea that chose Rayquaza instead. In 2015, a code was distributed to people in Japan who made advanced purchases of tickets for Pokémon the Movie: Hoopa and the Clash of Ages for players of Pokémon X, Y, Omega Ruby, and Alpha Sapphire with nineteen possible variants; the first eighteen holding an item corresponding to one of eighteen types, and the nineteenth possible variant being shiny. Separate serial code events were later distributed across various retailers worldwide in July 2016 to celebrate the franchise's 20th anniversary, with the distribution re-running online later that year in December. A code was distributed in the CoroCoro Comic magazine which allowed players to obtain Arceus in Pokémon Ultra Sun and Ultra Moon. In Pokémon Brilliant Diamond and Shining Pearl, a post-launch update allowed players to legitimately obtain the Azure Flute and access the Hall of Origin to catch Arceus, provided they have a save file of Pokémon Legends: Arceus with the game's story completed. This marked the first time Arceus was legitimately made available as a shiny Pokémon outside of Japanese copies of the sixth-generation games. Arceus is also coded into Pokémon Scarlet and Violet and can be used in the game by players that transferred one via Pokémon Home from a previous entry in the series, with its Plates being obtainable from auctions at the Porto Marinada Market.

Arceus is the title character of the video game Pokémon Legends: Arceus, where it is responsible for sending the protagonist back into the past to a land called Hisui, which is the name of the Sinnoh region in the past, given a phone called the "Arc Phone" and tasked with seeking out every Pokémon. Throughout the game, space-time rifts are opened, causing Pokémon to become frenzied. Eventually, the player works with a merchant named Volo, who helps them investigate and discover different Plates. Once they are all gathered, Volo reveals that he was responsible for causing the rifts to summon the Pokémon Giratina, who was banished, as well as his goal of causing Arceus to appear so he could use it to destroy the world and replace it with one he felt was superior. Volo battles the player with Giratina, ultimately loses, and gives them the final Plate, allowing them to obtain the Azure Flute. Once the player collects one of every Pokémon, they can play the Azure Flute to encounter Arceus in the Hall of Origin, at which point it will do battle with them. Upon defeat, it grants the player a fragment of itself, which manifests as an Arceus that the player can use in their party, as well as an item called the Legend Plate that lets Arceus and Judgment change type mid-battle.

=== In other media ===
Arceus has appeared in the Pokémon Trading Card Game, featured in the set "Arceus Advent". In this set, there are 12 different Arceus cards, each with a different ability and some with different types. They also have a ripple symbol on each card that, when all cards are lined up, form one ripple. A Shiny variant card of Arceus was also released. It appears in Pokémon TCG Pocket, where the two cards it received were the rarest available in its debut set. In the video game Pokémon Go, an event called "Pokémon Go Tour: Sinnoh" was announced. Whether Arceus would be included was "hotly debated" by Pokémon Go players before developer Niantic confirmed it would not be. A representative explained that it was an "extra special" Pokémon, and thus, they wanted to ensure it was given special attention when it was added to the game.

In the video game Pokémon Conquest, the antagonist, Oda Nobunaga, seeks to conquer the Ransei region, which is shaped like Arceus. In turn, the protagonist seeks to counter this by uniting the region under their banner, which would allow them to summon Arceus. It is later revealed that Nobunaga also planned to summon Arceus to end the conflicts of the land. Arceus is eventually summoned by the protagonist, who aids them in defeating Nobunaga. It also appears in other games, such as Pokémon Shuffle Mobile and Pokémon Masters EX. Arceus has received multiple pieces of merchandise, including plushes, figurines, model kits, and apparel.

A film titled Pokémon: Arceus and the Jewel of Life was released in 2011, starring Arceus as the central Pokémon. In it, Arceus awakens in its pocket dimension and attacks the human's dimension, who have angered it. Dialga, Palkia, and Giratina join forces to stop Arceus, though are ultimately defeated. This anger is determined to be due to humans refusing to return a jewel containing its life force it created to help them create civilization. Protagonist Ash Ketchum ultimately resolves the conflict by giving it back the jewel, causing it to become placated and leave. The film was adapted into a manga, which is a straightforward, truncated retelling of the film. Arceus was featured in a set of four television specials released exclusively on Amazon Prime Video which ties into Pokémon Legends: Arceus, featuring the Pokémon. In the Detective Pikachu film, multiple references exist to Arceus, including a statue depicting it alongside Dialga and Palkia. In season 8 of medical drama House, the titular character, Gregory House, mentions Arceus in the episode "Perils of Paranoia" during a discussion between his team about a patient, referencing its role as creator of the universe and states of matter.

== Reception ==
Arceus has been generally well received. In a poll of Japanese fans in 2016, Arceus was voted the second-best Pokémon. It has been listed in multiple best of Pokémon lists by critics as well, including IGN and Game Informer. Writer Caleb Compton regarded Arceus' design as "fittingly divine", stating that he appreciated how the designs of Dialga, Palkia, and Giratina are connected to Arceus'. He felt that their faces bore the strongest resemblance to Arceus, adding that this both helped convey that they are a trio and conveyed their connection to Arceus. Compton praised Arceus' and the trio's designs, stating that while they were complicated, they felt "powerful and legendary". Following internal leaks revealing a beta design of Arceus, this design became popular with fans who created memes, fan art, and a mod that adds it into one of the games. Patricia Hernandez of Polygon described it as looking like a ghost or cryptid as designed by a child, stating that it made it "endearing and humbling" due in part to its "softer, rounder lines". Arceus is considered among the most powerful Pokémon. In Pokémon TCG Pocket, the card Arceus EX became a dominating card in competitive play, GamesRadar+ writer Catherine Lewis stating that it is a stronger version of the card Pikachu EX, which was previously dominating the competitive meta.

Nintendo Life writer Alana Hagues felt that the final boss against Arceus in Pokémon Legends: Arceus was among the best video game bosses, praising it for how "frustrating and challenging" while still being rewarding. She found issues with the camera and feeling the game was "clunky", stating that while both of these things caused her to struggle against Arceus, she found it acceptable since she was fighting 'God'. Hagues believed that this was the most similar the series has been to being similar to a Japanese role-playing game. IGN writer Rebekah Valentine also made the comparison between the battle with Arceus and Japanese role-playing games, particularly having the final battle be against a god that wronged the protagonist. She felt that Arceus somewhat fulfilled this, stating that the game treats the encounter as "beautiful", but argued that Arceus does not care about the world and created the series' most "tragic" story. She cited multiple factors, including forcing a child into a dangerous world. Valentine compared this to myths involving a "deity calling a young hero out of their comfort zone to help a people in peril", but argued that Arceus' motivations seemed to suggest it was a game to it without allowing the child to go home. She also noted how Ingo was also taken without his memory or any explanation for why he was here, and that Arceus was ultimately responsible for the problems that occur in the game due to what it did to Giratina. She described it as "part trickster, part vengeful Old Testament deity, and part the more absent God of modernity".

Author Suraj Sood stated that Arceus in the movie Arceus and the Jewel of Light represented a vengeful Old Testament God, and felt that the theme for its battle in Arceus had an anxious feel that conveyed the "urgency of creation". He noted Judgment in his discussion as Arceus as a God, describing it as a "powerful, gracious, rewarding [God that] can take many forms". He added that Arceus is "ironically worship[ed]" by Pokémon fans, citing a Facebook page titled "Arceism" to center around Arceus. According to GamesRadar+ writer Ashley Reed, Arceus is theorized that the Pokémon Unown was used by Arceus to create the universe. She cited different explanations, including Unown congregating when Arceus summons the egg of either Dialga, Palkia, or Giratina, as well as a "plethora of Unown" sounding similar to the Azure Flute. Authors Alvin Haddadène and Loup Lassinat-Foubert argued that Arceus may have been inspired by various religious and mythological figures, including Avalokiteshvara, a Buddhist figure who possesses 1,000 arms in one form, and the deities Hecatoncheires from Greek mythology.
