= Pokémon Master Journeys: The Series =

Twenty-fourth season of the Pokémon animated television series

- Season 24
- Pokémon Master Journeys: The Series poster
- No. of episodes: 42

Release
- Original network: TV Tokyo
- Original release: December 11, 2020 – December 10, 2021

Season chronology
- ← Previous; Journeys Next → Ultimate Journeys

Pokémon Master Journeys: The Series is the twenty-fourth season of the Pokémon anime series and the second season of Pokémon Journeys: The Series, known in Japan as Pocket Monsters (ポケットモンスター, Poketto Monsutā). The season premiered in Japan from December 11, 2020, to December 10, 2021, on TV Tokyo; in Canada, the season premiered on Teletoon in June 2021, Télétoon in July 2021. and in the United States, it was released as a streaming television season with its first 12 episodes on September 10, 2021, on Netflix, with new episodes released on January 21, and May 26, 2022. This season continues the research fellowship adventures of Ash Ketchum and Goh, as they travel across all eight regions, including the new Galar region from Pokémon Sword and Shield.

== Episode list ==
Jap. overall (Note: The English episode numbers are based on their first streaming in the United States on Netflix. Other English-speaking nations largely either follow this order or the Japanese order. Episodes released on Netflix in the U.S. are released quarterly while those on TV networks outside of the U.S. are aired weekly.)	Eng. overall	No. in season	English title Japanese title	Original release date	English release date
1136	1129	1	"To Train, or Not to Train! (Koharu and the Mysterious, Mysterious Eievui!)"; Transliteration: "Koharu to Fushigina Fushigina Ībui!" (Japanese: コハルと不思議な不思議なイーブイ！)	December 11, 2020	September 10, 2021
At a Vermilion City research center studying Eevee, an Eevee tries to imitate different evolved Eevee without success. Seeing Chloe's Yamper walk by with Ash and Pikachu, it escapes from the center and follows Yamper, with whom it becomes friendly with. When two lab assistants from the center chase after Eevee, Yamper leads it to Chloe's school, where Chloe spots them and enlists Goh's help to block the assistants while she escapes with Eevee. Team Rocket, who's infiltrated the school disguised as students, attempt to steal all of the Pokémon in the school playground, including Goh's Cinderace and Sobble, and when Ash and Pikachu try to stop them, they fall into Team Rocket's classic pit trap. Yamper leaps to Eevee's defense, but when its attack fails, Eevee battles alongside it, imitating and using Yamper's electric attack, and Pikachu (who escaped from the pit) finishes up with a Thunderbolt. The head of the research facility comes to take Eevee back, but Eevee, who's become attached to Chloe (who feels the same way), runs back to her. With the head's approval, Eevee allows Chloe to catch it.
1137	1130	2	"A Pinch of This, a Pinch of That! (Galar's Fossils! Stick 'em Together!!)"; Transliteration: "Gararu no Kaseki! Gatchanko!!" (Japanese: ガラルの化石！がっちゃんこ！！)	January 8, 2021	September 10, 2021
The Director of the Pewter Museum of Science has requested for Ash, Goh, and Chloe's help in investigating fossils in the Galar region. When they arrive at the site, they are introduced to Bray Zenn and Cara Liss. The researchers dig up fossils, predicting that they will be restored into Arctovish and Dracozolt. However, once the restoration process is complete, the fossils are restored into Dracovish and Arctozolt instead. Once Bray Zenn and Cara Liss are finished with their research on the two new Pokémon, they give Ash and Goh permission to keep them. Ash catches Dracovish, while Goh catches Arctozolt.
1138	1131	3	"Trials of a Budding Master! (Kamonegi's Great Trial!)"; Transliteration: "Kamonegi Ōinaru Shiren!" (Japanese: カモネギ大いなる試練！)	January 15, 2021	September 10, 2021
While Ash is in the middle of a training session, Goh informs him of an outbreak of Geodude over at the Rock Tunnel. After Goh catches a Geodude with the help of Ash's Farfetch'd, Ash receives an alert for a nearby World Coronation Series participant. A trainer named Dozer appears with his Gurdurr, ready to challenge Ash and his Farfetch'd. The battle results in a victory for Ash, raising his rank to 381. After, another trainer, Rinto, appears. Rinto mentions that he watched Ash's previous battle and challenges him and his Farfetch'd to an unofficial match. Farfetch'd ends up losing to Rinto's Gallade, but Rinto tells Ash that they will battle again when Ash and Farfetch'd remain synchronized. Later, Ash shows his Farfetch'd his willingness to help it become a leek master.
1139	1132	4	"How Are You Gonna Keep 'Em Off of the Farm? (Agricultural Experience! Where is Digda!?)"; Transliteration: "Nōgyō Taiken! Diguda wa Dokoda!?" (Japanese: 農業体験！ディグダはどこだ！？)	January 22, 2021	September 10, 2021
A shipment of vegetables arrives at the Cerise Laboratory, which was sent by Laxton, a former student of Professor Cerise's. Laxton, now a farmer, mentions that a group of Diglett and Dugtrio have been ruining his crops. Ash, Goh, and Chloe visit the farm to investigate the issue.
1140	1133	5	"Healing the Healer! (Get the Legend?! Find the Guardian Water Deity Suicune!!)"; Transliteration: "Densetsu Getto!? Mizu no Shugoshin Suikun o Sagase!!" (Japanese: 伝説ゲット！？水の守護神スイクンを探せ！！)	January 29, 2021	September 10, 2021
The Legendary Pokémon Suicune is said to travel across the world, purifying polluted water as it goes. Professor Cerise informs Ash and Goh about Suicune, sending them to Johto to investigate. Once there, Ash and Goh encounter a group of Pokémon hunters that are intending to capture Suicune. While Suicune is being attacked, Goh throws a Poké Ball at it and catches it. Ash and Goh are pursued by the hunters, but the duo is able to get them arrested. Goh attempts to release Suicune, but it opts to remain his Pokémon while it travels around the world.
1141	1134	6	"Sobble Spies a Stealthy Strategy! (Messon in Possible!)"; Transliteration: "Messon in Posshiburu!" (Japanese: メッソン・イン・ポッシブル！)	February 5, 2021	September 10, 2021
Ash and Goh visit a movie set starring a famous actress named Jacqueline and her partner Pokémon Inteleon, the final evolutionary form of Sobble. Goh's Sobble becomes amazed after seeing Inteleon's capabilities and begins to admire it. With Sobble being timid all the time, Goh decides to train with Sobble to build its confidence.
1142	1135	7	"The Tale of You and Glimwood Tangle! (The Tale of You and Me in Luminous Maze Forest)"; Transliteration: "Kimi to Ruminasu Meizu no Mori no Monogatari" (Japanese: 君とルミナスメイズの森の物語)	February 12, 2021	September 10, 2021
Chloe and Eevee discover a book titled "The Tale of You and Me in Glimwood Tangle" at the Cerise Laboratory, with a drawing of a Ponyta and Rapidash in their Galarian forms. Having taken an interest in the two Pokémon, Chloe decides to go to Glimwood Tangle with Ash and Goh. After the trio arrive, Ash and Goh get separated from Chloe, with the two of them running into Opal, while Chloe befriends a Galarian Ponyta who needs assistance in treating an injured Galarian Rapidash.
1143	1136	8	"Searching for Chivalry! (The Four Heavenly Kings Gampi! Chivalry Hall!!)"; Transliteration: "Shiten'nō Ganpi! Kishidō no Yakata!!" (Japanese: 四天王ガンピ！騎士道の館！！)	February 19, 2021	September 10, 2021
Ash and Goh visit the Castle of Chivalry in the Kalos region to further their training with their Farfetch'd and Scyther respectively. They find out that it is run by Wikstrom, the Steel-type member of the Kalos Elite Four. Wikstrom reveals that they have to succeed in three tasks to earn a Knight Medal. Ash, Farfetch'd and Goh with his Scyther participate and succeed in the three tasks and are rewarded with Knight medals. Wikstrom suggests Goh should evolve his Scyther into Scizor, which he does, while Ash and Farfetch'd have improved their teamwork abilities.
1144	1137	9	"Memories of a Warming Kindness! (Love is Koduck)"; Transliteration: "Koi wa Kodakku" (Japanese: 恋はコダック)	February 26, 2021	September 10, 2021
On a cold evening, Chloe arrives at the Cerise Laboratory and sees Professor Cerise leaving. Ash and Goh head out to catch Ice-type Pokémon. So, Chrysa and Chloe spend a girl's night in Chrysa's apartment. Chloe accidentally looks at a photo of Chrysa and a Psyduck and its trainer. Chloe mistakes the trainer as Chrysa's boyfriend and later learns that the Psyduck helped Chrysa when she was in a bad mood. Meanwhile, Ash and Goh are unable to find any ice-type Pokémon. Disappointed, they head out to eat ramen and unknowingly they find the mysterious trainer and its Psyduck. They tell Chloe about the mysterious trainer and its Psyduck, she confirms that it was the same trainer and his Psyduck that Chrysa met years ago. They search for the trainer and his Psyduck, unsuccessful at first, but they find the trainer and his Psyduck and take him to Chrysa. A reunion happens between Chrysa and Psyduck and Chrysa's joy knows no bounds, as Chloe gets in angush by finding out that Psyduck's trainer is not Chrysa's boyfriend.
1145	1138	10	"A Rollicking Roll... (Panic! Gokulin Ball!!)"; Transliteration: "Panikku! Gokurin-dama!!" (Japanese: パニック！ゴクリン球！！)	March 5, 2021	September 10, 2021
1145	1138	10	"Eyes on the Goal! (Come on Kamukame Turtle Race!)"; Transliteration: "Kamon Kamukame Kame Rēsu!" (Japanese: カモンカムカメカメレース！)	March 5, 2021	September 10, 2021
"A Rollicking Roll...": When a bunch of Gulpin start dispensing from Team Rocket's Rocket Prize Master machine, a chaotic situation develops in Vermilion City when the Gulpin start sticking to each other and various objects, forming a giant ball. "Eyes on the Goal!": Meowth and Wobbuffet follow a Chewtle to a nearby playground where they encounter a Turtwig that develops a rivalry with Chewtle. The two turtle Pokémon challenge each other to a race.
1146	1139	11	"When a House is Not a Home! (Lost Sarunori! Who is the Trainer!?)"; Transliteration: "Maigo no Sarunori! Torēnā wa Dareda!?" (Japanese: 迷子のサルノリ！トレーナーは誰だ！？)	March 12, 2021	September 10, 2021
When Goh wakes up from a nightmare about Rillaboom, he discovers a Grookey sleeping in his arms. He tries to catch it, only to find out that it belongs to someone else. Ash and Goh decide to go look for its trainer, where they discover later on that it belongs to Team Rocket. During the battle, Grookey smashes its own Poké Ball and allows Goh to catch it as they defeat Team Rocket.
1147	1140	12	"Beyond Chivalry... Aiming to be a Leek Master! (Aim to Be a Scallion Master! Charge with Chivalry!!)"; Transliteration: "Mezase Negi Masutā! Tsuranuke Kishidō!!" (Japanese: めざせネギマスター！つらぬけ騎士道！！)	March 19, 2021	September 10, 2021
Ash's World Coronation Series rank has risen to 273, meaning he is nearing entry into the Ultra Class. Ash and Goh come across Rinto, who is also participating in the World Coronation Series. It turns out that in the first encounter, Rinto was in the Normal Class, hence why Ash did not receive an official notification. However, since Rinto is now in the Great Class, both challengers can officially battle each other. Ash and Farfetch'd battle with Rinto and his Gallade, but find themselves struggling when Gallade destroy's Fafetch'd's leak. After encouragement from Ash, Farfetch'd changes its strategy and evolves into Sirfetch'd, defeating Gallade and bringing Ash's rank to 184.
1148	1141	13	"Searching for Service with a Smile! (Leave Everything To Us! The Plusle and Minun Handymen!!)"; Transliteration: "Marutto Omakase! Purasuru Mainan Benriya-san!!" (Japanese: まるっとおまかせ！プラスルマイナン便利屋さん！！)	April 9, 2021	January 21, 2022
After fixing the faucets at Cerise Laboratory, Devi, one of two handymen known as "The Plusle and Minun All Service", trips on the stairs and hurts himself. Ash and Goh offer to help the other handyman, Multa, by filling in for the injured Devi. Their jobs include brushing a rich man's herd of Tauros, rescuing a trainer's Tauros in Rock Tunnel, and fixing a fountain that has sprung a leak. Later, they save the rich man's Tauros from falling deeper into a manhole after Meowth had fallen into it while stealing the Tauros.
1149	1142	14	"Not Too Close for Comfort! (Damp Jimereon)"; Transliteration: "Jimejime Jimereon" (Japanese: じめじめジメレオン)	April 16, 2021	January 21, 2022
After Goh's Sobble saves an Oddish that got into trouble, it evolves into Drizzile, but is upset that it didn't evolve directly into Inteleon. Retreating to a cave and cutting itself off from everyone, Goh attempts to provide encouragement through a past trauma of his own.
1150	1143	15	"On Land, In the Sea, and to the Future! (Challenge! Pokémon Marine Athletic!!)"; Transliteration: "Chōsen! Pokémon Marin Asurechikku!!" (Japanese: 挑戦！ポケモンマリンアスレチック！！)	April 23, 2021	January 21, 2022
Ash, Goh, and Chloe travel to the Hoenn region, where they participate in a Marine Athletics Competition held in Lilycove City. They meet Kiley, who has a Vaporeon. Later, Kiley gives Chloe a Water Stone to give to her Eevee. However, Eevee decides not to evolve.
1151	1144	16	"Absol Absolved! (The Detested Absol!)"; Transliteration: "Kirawareta Abusoru" (Japanese: 嫌われたアブソル)	April 30, 2021	January 21, 2022
Hodge, who befriended Ash during the Battle Frontier Flute Cup in the Hoenn region, requests Ash and Goh's help in investigating an issue with the hot springs in Lavaridge Town, where the residents believe an Absol is the cause. Ash and Goh discover that the actual cause of the problem was caused by a boulder that was blocking the source of the hot springs. Later, Goh catches the Absol that was believed to be the suspect.
1152	1145	17	"Thrash of the Titans! (Dragon Battle! Satoshi vs. Iris!!)"; Transliteration: "Doragon Batoru! Satoshi Buiesu Airisu!!" (Japanese: ドラゴンバトル！サトシVSアイリス！！)	May 7, 2021	January 21, 2022
Ash receives a letter from his old traveling companion Iris, requesting a battle in the World Coronation Series. When Ash and Goh arrive in Opelucid City, Ash finds out his old friend has become the new Unova League Champion. Iris explains that she still doesn't consider herself a Dragón Master, however, hence her entry into the World Coronation Series. During the battle, Ash's Dragonite struggles against Iris' Dragonite, forcing Ash to substitute in Dracovish and take the first win, but Iris's Haxorus (revealed to have evolved from Axew) defeats Dracovish. Just as it seems like Ash's Dragonite will lose, Iris provides support, giving Dragonite a confidence boost, resulting in it learning powerful Draco Meteor and claiming victory. Ash's win brings his rank to 99, promoting him to the Ultra Class.
1153	1146	18	"Under Color of Darkness! (Flabebe's White Flower)"; Transliteration: "Furabebe no Shiroi Hana" (Japanese: フラベベの白い花)	May 14, 2021	January 21, 2022
In the Cerise Park, four of Goh's five Flabébé all evolve into Floette, but his white flower Flabébé is struggling to fly and has lost one of the petals on its fairy flower. Ash and Goh head to the Kalos Region to search for a new flower, but are unsuccessful. The next morning, the boys are alerted of a flower shop in Kalos, so they meet the owner, who talks about an identical experience that her Florges went through. Ash and Goh go to the area where the flower could be found, successfully locating one this time. Flabébé picks its flower and slowly evolves into Floette, which learns Grassy Terrain and spreads more of its flowers, Goh realizes that Floette wants to stay and protects its flowers, so he releases his White Flower Floette.
1154	1147	19	"Sleuths for Truth! (Suspect Pikachu!?)"; Transliteration: "Yōgisha Pikachū!?" (Japanese: 容疑者ピカチュウ！？)	May 21, 2021	January 21, 2022
One day Officer Jenny and Detective Decker visit Cerise Laboratory. They explain that they've come to check the Electric type Pokémon there as part of a search for the culprit of a series of electricity theft incidents that have taken place in Vermillion City. After suspecting a number of Electric-type Pokémon there, including Yamper, they eventually arrest Pikachu for the crimes, leaving Ash to prove his Pokémon partner's innocence.
1155	1148	20	"Advice to Goh! (Rivals for Go?! The Road to Mew!!)"; Transliteration: "Gō ni Raibaru!? Myū e no Michi!!" (Japanese: ゴウにライバル！？ミュウへの道！！)	May 28, 2021	January 21, 2022
Ash and Goh return to Pallet Town. Goh meets Professor Oak, while Ash greets his old Pokémon that he used in past regions. Professor Oak then tells Goh and Ash about Project Mew, a project that is looking for the Mythical Pokémon, Mew. Ash then realizes that his Infernape is gone, leaving him and Goh on the hunt. They are attacked by a wild Onix, but Gary and his Blastoise save them. Ash greets Gary while Goh meets him for the first time. They then head to a mountain, where they locate Infernape, who has come to battle Moltres. However, the group is no match for Moltres, who flies away and drops one of its feathers, which Gary collects. They return to Professor Oak's lab, where they learn that Gary is a member of Project Mew, resulting in Goh deciding to join as well.
1156	1149	21	"Errand Endurance! (Watch Over My First Errand!)"; Transliteration: "Hajimete no Otsukai Mimamoritai!" (Japanese: はじめてのおつかい見守りたいっ！)	June 4, 2021	January 21, 2022
Ash, Goh and Chloe are visiting a Pokémon Center, where the naughty Grookey and Eevee are constantly keeping them on their toes. Goh and Chloe insist their Pokémon are good kids, and Ash decides to help out by suggesting they give the Pokémon duo an errand to run. Will their first ever errand go smoothly?
1157	1150	22	"Take My Thief! Please! (Please! Get Morpeko!!)"; Transliteration: "Onegai! Morupeko Getto Shite!!" (Japanese: おねがい！モルペコゲットして！！)	June 11, 2021	January 21, 2022
The Morpeko that has settled down in Team Rocket's hideout is a massive glutton that's even eating Jessie's cakes and the food James hid. Team Rocket attempts to release it back to the wild, but James finds his relation with Morpeko ends in capturing it.
1158	1151	23	"Leaping Toward the Dream! (Let's Go! Project Mew!!)"; Transliteration: "Rettsu Gō! Purojekuto Myū!!" (Japanese: レッツゴー！プロジェクト・ミュウ！！)	June 18, 2021	January 21, 2022
One day Goh receives an email from Project Mew asking him to come to the laboratory on the foot of Mt. Coronet in the Sinnoh Region. He immediately heads there with Ash, and when he arrives, he's finally given his first mission: catch an Alolan Ninetales in the glacial area north of Mt. Coronet. Will Goh be able to complete his mission?
1159	1152	24	"Everybody's Doing the Underground Shuffle! (Shuffle Panic in the Underground Labyrinth!?)"; Transliteration: "Chika Meikyū Shaffuru Panikku!?" (Japanese: 地下迷宮シャッフルパニック！？)	June 25, 2021	January 21, 2022
Ash, Goh and Chloe head to Driftveil City in the Unova region after learning that a new evolved form of Klink has been discovered. There, they discover a hole that leads far into the underground, and Grookey and Eevee jump in out of curiosity. Ash and the others follow them, and discover that the hole leads into a labyrinthic area. And when Team Rocket jumps after them in their pursuit of Pikachu, things turn into a complete chase where everyone runs into each other.
1160	1153	25	"Grabbing the Brass Ring! (Captain Pikachu! Advance Tairetsu!!)"; Transliteration: "Pikachū Taichō! Susume Tairētsu!!" (Japanese: ピカチュウ隊長！進めタイレーツ！！)	July 16, 2021	January 21, 2022
Ash and Goh return to the Galar region. On a faraway glacier where a lot of Eiscue live, an Eiscue floats away and ends up in the Galar region. While Ash and Goh continue their research, they encounter a Galarian Stunfisk which Goh catches. They later encounter Falinks who then attack a wild Boldore. Grookey makes the Falinks mad and they charge at Ash, Goh, Pikachu, and Grookey, but are attacked by Pikachu's Thunderbolt. Ash and Goh pick up the hurt Falinks, and the leader gets depressed because they can't lead its group. The other Falinks in its group start to follow Pikachu. Go decides to practice the leader Falinks to lead its group by using his Pokémon to be in the group. The two groups then meet up and the leader Falinks and Pikachu switch groups. The Falinks then see Eiscue and wants to battle it, resulting in a victory. The Falinks are happy that they won the battle, and allows Goh to catch them. At the end of the episode, Eiscue returns home where the other Eiscue live.
1161	1154	26	"Nightfall? Nightmares! (Darkrai - Midsummer Night's Dream)"; Transliteration: "Dākurai - Manatsu no Yo no Yume" (Japanese: ダークライ 真夏の夜の夢)	July 23, 2021	January 21, 2022
Ash and Goh travel to the Sinnoh region to investigate after learning that people are unable to sleep due to nightmares. The two of them suspect that a Darkrai is causing the nightmares. Meanwhile, Chloe travels to Sinnoh by herself and eventually meets Ash's former traveling companion, Dawn. As Ash and Goh try to search for Darkrai, they realize that Cresselia is able to prevent nightmares caused by Darkrai. In a forest, Chloe and Dawn find an injured Cresselia.
1162	1155	27	"A Midsummer Night's Light! (Cresselia - Midsummer Night's Light)"; Transliteration: "Kureseria - Manatsu no Yo no Hikari" (Japanese: クレセリア 真夏の夜の光)	July 30, 2021	January 21, 2022
Chloe and Dawn help the injured Cresselia. Elsewhere, Ash and Goh encounter Darkrai and follow it. The girls also run into Darkrai and the Team Rocket trio before escaping to a beach, where they eventually meet up with the boys. The Matori Matrix arrives to capture Cresselia. Darkrai appears to protect Cresselia, but it is weakened by an electric attack. Cresselia uses Lunar Dance to heal Darkrai. After Team Rocket is dealt with, Cresselia and Darkrai return to Fullmoon Island and Newmoon Island respectively.
1163	1156	28	"All Out, All of the Time! (Full Power! Alola Uninhabited Island Race!!)"; Transliteration: "Zenryoku! Arōra Mujintō Rēsu!!" (Japanese: ゼンリョク！アローラ無人島レース！！)	August 13, 2021	May 26, 2022
Ash and Goh travel to the Alola region to participate in the Pokémon Capture Adventure Race. After they arrive, they are approached by two brothers who admire Ash. During this encounter, Goh learns that Ash is actually the Alola League Champion. The brothers introduce themselves as the All-out Brothers and reveal that they are participating in the competition as well. The competition requires all participants to catch an Alolan Geodude, a Bruxish, and a Passimian. The race is interrupted by Team Rocket, who are there to steal Ash's Pikachu. However, the All-out Brothers foil their plans by having their Kommo-o use its newly perfected Z-move, and eventually rescuing the Pokémon that were captured. Ash and Goh win the race by crossing the finish line before the All-out Brothers. Meanwhile, Team Rocket reunite with their Alola Pokémon and Bewear and Stufful. After the race, the All-out Brothers thank Ash for giving them advice on how to use Z-moves. Ash then receives a notification for his upcoming World Coronation Series match. His opponent is revealed to be the Sunyshore City Gym Leader, Volkner, who is ranked 27th overall in the World Coronation Series.
1164	1157	29	"Ultra Exciting from the Shocking Start! (Super Electromagnetic Hyper Class Battle!)"; Transliteration: "Chō Denji Haipā Kurasu Batoru!" (Japanese: 超電磁ハイパークラスバトル！)	August 20, 2021	May 26, 2022
Ash and Goh head to the Sinnoh region for Ash's next World Coronation Series match against Volkner. Ash reunites with Volkner, with the latter noticing Ash's Z-Power Ring. On the battlefield, Ash begins the battle by sending out Lucario while Volkner sends out his Luxray, and has it use Electric Terrain to power up electric-type moves. Lucario fires out an Aura Sphere but Luxray uses Rising Voltage to counter. Ash decides to recall Lucario and sends out Gangar to deal with Luxray. Luxray uses Snarl but Gangar dodges. Gangar uses Psychic on Luxray and follows up with a Night Shade. Luxray is hit and recalled in favor of Fan Rotom. Fan Rotom uses Air Slash but Gangar uses Night Shade to counter. Gangar attempts an Ice Punch on Fan Rotom but it uses Thunder Wave before Gangar can get to it. Gangar gets paralyzed and is defeated by Fan Rotom's Hex. Ash then sends in Pikachu to battle. However, Fan Rotom is recalled and Electivire is sent out. Pikachu's Thunderbolt does no damage to Electivire due to it having Motor Drive as its ability. Pikachu takes an Iron Tail and is switched out for Lucario. Lucario gets paralyzed after being hit by a Thunder Punch. Fan Rotom is sent out again and uses Hex on Lucario. Lucario retaliates with Reversal and Fan Rotom is knocked out. Luxray is sent out and uses Rising Voltage, while Lucario uses Aura Sphere. Both attacks collide, causing both Pokémon to faint afterwards. After Pikachu and Electivire clash with Iron Tails, Ash and Pikachu use 10,000,000 Volt Thunderbolt and defeat Electivire. At the conclusion of the battle, Ash's rank goes up to 64 and is complimented by Volkner, who reveals that Cynthia, the Sinnoh League Champion, is in the Master Class.
1165	1158	30	"Detective Drizzile! (The Targeted Sakuragi Institute!)"; Transliteration: "Nerawareta Sakuragi Kenkyūjo!" (Japanese: 狙われたサクラギ研究所！)	August 27, 2021	May 26, 2022
While everyone is sleeping, Drizzile goes out to train at the night. Everyone wakes up to see that all the data in the lab is gone. A Kecleon who's invisible is the one stealing the data. On the 2nd night, Drizzile is seen training again but decides to go into the lab and hears a noise. It goes where the noise came from and sees nothing. The next day, everyone in the lab is sad that the data is lost. Goh decides to go to the lab in the night and see why the data is disappearing. Drizzile sees Kecleon and throws its water balloons at it. Kecleon is no longer invisible. Ash and Pikachu wake up and go downstairs to see Kecleon running away while Goh tells Ash that Kecleon is the one that is stealing the data. They corner Kecleon but then a man named Gizmo appears on a jetpack and is happy about the data he collected. Drizzile and Kecleon clash together but Drizzile is caught by Kecleon's tongue and is thrown to the ground. Drizzile begins to cry as Goh protects him from Kecleon. Drizzile stands up and evolves into Inteleon and grabs Kecleon's tongue. Kecleon gets thrown to the ground. Kecleon uses Iron Tail but Inteleon's tail slams it to the ground. Gizmo and Kecleon try to fly away on their jetpack but Inteleon learns Snipe Shot. Gizmo and Kecleon fall to the ground but Inteleon glides and catches them. Prof. Cerise walks out of the lab and Gizmo is surprised. Gizmo starts weeping as he tells Prof. Cerise that he stole the data because he is a big fan of Prof. Cerise. Prof. Cerise forgives him as long as he returns the data.
1166	1159	31	"Night and Day, You Are the Ones! (The Moon and the Sun, Koharu and Haruhi!)"; Transliteration: "Tsuki to Taiyō, Koharu to Haruhi" (Japanese: 月と太陽、コハルとハルヒ)	September 3, 2021	May 26, 2022
Ash, Goh and Chloe visit the Eclipse Castle in the Johto region to take part in a festival. Once there, Ash and Goh are told the backstory of the Eclipse Castle by Helia, the current lord of the castle. Meanwhile, Chloe encounters Soleil after Chloe's Eevee is rescued from falling down a cliff by Soleil's Espeon. The two girls realize that they are clone of each other. Reuniting with Ash and Goh, Soleil tells the trio the history of her Espeon and Umbreon, and informs them that she will be named the new lord of the castle. While Chloe leaves to prepare for the festival, she is kidnapped by someone who mistakes her for Soleil. The mysterious trainer returns to the Eclipse Castle, who reveals himself as Ilunas, and demands that he be named lord of the castle. However, Ash and Goh arrive along with Chloe. A battle between Chloe and Soleil against Ilunas ensues, resulting in Ilunas defeat. Soleil approaches Ilunas and explains to him the traditions of the castle. Soleil's name shares a similarity with a previous lord of the castle, and Soleil's name shares a similarity with the brother of the previous lord who tried to dethrone his older sibling. Soleil realizes that Ilunas is a descendant of the brother from long ago. With this, Soleil and Ilunas unite, and are appointed lords of the Eclipse Castle.
1167	1160	32	"Trial on a Golden Scale! (Trial Mission! Ulgamoth's Golden Scales!!)"; Transliteration: "Toraiaru Misshon! Urugamosu Ōgon no Rinpun!" (Japanese: トライアルミッション！ウルガモス黄金の鱗粉！！)	September 10, 2021	May 26, 2022
Goh receives his first trial mission from Project Mew. He is given three options for his trial mission, eventually selecting "Gather Volcarona's golden scales". Ash and Goh are directed to an old mine shaft. While exploring the tunnels, Goh catches a Roggenrola and a Ferrothorn. The two boys, joined by a man, find Larvesta eggs. The man is revealed to be a Pokémon Hunter, and he attempts to escape with the Larvesta eggs, but Ash retrieves the eggs from the hunter. After a fire breaks out, a shiny Larvesta that evolves into Volcarona, uses Fire Spin to collect the fire. The Volcarona spreads golden scales from its wings, which Goh collects. While exiting the tunnels, the Pokémon Hunter reappears along with his henchmen, demanding Ash and Goh to hand over their Pokémon. However, Danika and Quillon arrive and defeat the poachers with their Urshifu. Once Goh's sample of the golden scales are scanned, he officially clears his first trial mission and earns a token.
1168	1161	33	"Mad About Blue! (Clash!? Blue Pokémania!)"; Transliteration: "Gekitotsu!? Ao Pokemania!" (Japanese: 激突！？青ポケマニア！)	September 17, 2021	May 26, 2022
While running through the streets, Ash and Goh chase after a shiny Voltorb, which Goh catches. After meeting up with Chloe, the trio are introduced to Gorman, a "Blue Pokémaniac" from Kalos. Gorman invites the trio to take part in blue themed activities.
1169	1162	34	"The Sweet Taste of Battle! (Mawhip's Sweet Battle!?)"; Transliteration: "Mahoippu no Amāi Batoru!?" (Japanese: マホイップの甘～いバトル！？)	October 1, 2021	May 26, 2022
Ash and Goh receive an invitation from Opal to take part in a tournament that she is hosting. Opal informs them that Leon will be in attendance, which excites Ash, who assumes that he may get a chance to battle Leon. At a restaurant, Goh catches a Milcery, which evolves into Alcremie. Ash, Goh, and Chloe arrive at Ballonlea Stadium and meet Raihan, Opal, and Leon. Opal reveals that the tournament is a cake decorating contest. Ash wins the contest and is challenged to an exhibition match against Opal. Opal sends out her gigantamaxed Alcremie and uses G-Max Finale on Ash's Pikachu, causing Pikachu to become "Feaxtemaxed" from the cream. As a result, Opal calls off the battle.
1170	1163	35	"Star Night, Star Flight! (The Py That Became A Star)"; Transliteration: "Ohoshi-sama ni Natta Pī" (Japanese: お星さまになったピィ)	October 8, 2021	May 26, 2022
A town in the Johto region starts to experience endless nights. Ash and Goh decide to investigate the phenomenon. Once there, the two boys meet a young girl named Tiara, who enjoys watching the stars as it reminds her of her Cleffa that recently became a star. After hearing a description of the Pokémon Tiara had seen, Goh believes an Unown is causing it to be dark. Ash and Goh head to a museum and meet up with Cynthia, who is also investigating the town's situation and asks to speak with Tiara. Tiara reveals that she had made a wish for her to be able to watch the stars forever. A group of Unown that had been listening nearby granted her wish. Tiara realizes the trouble she has caused and reassures her Cleffa that she'll be okay.
1171	1164	36	"An Adventure of Mega Proportions! (The Lucarionite! Great Adventure on Mega Island!!)"; Transliteration: "Rukarionaito! Mega Jima Dai Bōken!!" (Japanese: ルカリオナイト！メガ島大冒険！！)	October 22, 2021	May 26, 2022
Ash and Goh visit Kalos and head to Korrina's Gym where Korrina defeats a challenger with her Mega Lucario. After the battle, Ash reveals that he wants to mega evolve his Lucario. Korrina then gives Ash a Mega Glove. Lucario starts to sense the Lucarionite with its aura, and they head to Mega Island from where the signals are coming from. Ash, Korrina and Goh move ahead while Gurkinn stays back. The group gets separated, but thanks to Lucario's aura and its bond with Ash, they reunite and find the Lucarionite. When they are about to take it, a man with his Mega Alakazam challenges Ash to take it from his possession. Ash accepts the challenge and battles Mega Alakazam with his Lucario. After initially struggling, they trick Mega Alakazam and manage to get hold of the Lucarionite. While Ash and his friends are celebrating their victory, the man with the Mega Alakazam reveals to them that he is Gurkinn in disguise. While returning to Shalour City, Ash gets a notification that his next Ultra Class battle is against his rival Bea, whose rank is revealed to be 30.
1172	1165	37	"Battle Three with Bea! (Rival Showdown! Satoshi vs. Saito!!)"; Transliteration: "Raibaru Kessen! Satoshi Buiesu Saitō!!" (Japanese: ライバル決戦！サトシVSサイトウ！！)	October 29, 2021	May 26, 2022
Ash and Goh arrive at the Stow-on-Side Stadium, where Ash intends to have a third World Coronation Series battle against Bea. Ash and Goh notice Bea training with her Pokémon. Bea's full team is revealed to be Machamp, Hawlucha, Grapploct, Hitmontop, Pangora, and Falinks. After eating some snacks that Korrina had brought, Ash starts to develop a strategy for the battle that night, while Goh wishes him good luck for the battle. Before the battle begins, Ash has his Mega Glove equipped to Mega Evolution his Lucario, while Bea has her Dynamax Band to Gigantamax her Machamp. Ash starts off with Pikachu, while Bea brings out her Grapploct. After Pikachu's Electroweb fails to contain Grapploct, Ash swaps Pikachu for Lucario. Bea switches Grapploct for Hawlucha, and later Machamp. When Lucario struggles against Machamp's Bullet Punch, Ash attempts to trigger Lucario's Mega Evolution. However, Lucario refuses to do so, and manages to shake off Machamp by bashing it with its head. Leon arrives and proclaims the deep bond between Ash and Lucario, mentioning that Lucario will mega evolve at the appropriate time. Ash and Bea return their focus to the battle and declare themselves to be the ones to battle Leon.
1173	1166	38	"A Battle of Mega Versus Max! (Mega Evolution vs. Kyodaimax!)"; Transliteration: "Mega Shinka Buiesu Kyodaimakkusu" (Japanese: メガシンカVSキョダイマックス)	November 5, 2021	May 26, 2022
Ash and Bea's World Coronation Series battle continues, with Ash bringing out Sirfetch'd. Bea swaps Machamp for Hawlucha and defeats Sirfetch'd with a Sky Attack. Pikachu finishes off Hawlucha with a Thunderbolt but is subsequently taken out by Grapploct. Lucario returns to the battle and avenges Pikachu by knocking out Grapploct. Lucario and Machamp are matched up once again. Bea gigantamaxes her Machamp into Gigantamax Machamp, while Ash activates Lucario's Mega Evolution for the first time into Mega Lucario. After returning to its normal form, Machamp and Mega Lucario collide with a Bullet Punch and Force Palm respectively. However, Lucario learns a most powerful Steel Beam and defeats Machamp. Ash's victory results in his rank improving to 36.
1174	1167	39	"Breaking the Ice! (The Ice Queen and Glaceon!)"; Transliteration: "Kōri no Joō to Gureishia" (Japanese: 氷の女王とグレイシア)	November 12, 2021	May 26, 2022
A transfer student named Regina enrolls at the same school that Goh and Chloe attend. After Regina is introduced to the class, she is greeted and asked various questions from her classmates, causing her Glaceon named "Mirche" to come to her defense. Regina recalls her past experiences of being bullied at her former schools.
1175	1168	40	"Looking Out for Number Two! (Trial Mission! The Deep Sea Diver Research Team!!)"; Transliteration: "Toraiaru Misshon! Shinkai Sensui Chōsa-dan!!" (Japanese: トライアルミッション！深海潜水調査団！！)	November 19, 2021	May 26, 2022
Goh receives his next Project Mew Trial Mission, requiring him to catch a Kingdra. During the mission, Ash and Goh meet up with Drake, a member of the Hoenn Elite Four, who offers to help Goh with his assignment. The three of them locate a Kingdra shaped submarine and find a Dragon Scale inside a treasure chest. Later, a wild Seadra helps Ash and Goh find a Kingdra, which Goh eventually catches. Goh is rewarded with another Project Mew token for completing the task.
1176	1169	41	"The Gates of Warp! (Dialga & Palkia! The Space-time Cataclysm!!)"; Transliteration: "Diaruga Ando Parukia! Jikū Dai Ihen!!" (Japanese: ディアルガ&パルキア！時空大異変！！)	December 3, 2021	May 26, 2022
When Dawn's Piplup runs into a forest, another Dawn from an alternate universe takes Piplup with her. Dawn informs Ash, Goh and Chloe about the incident, and the trio travel to Sinnoh to meet up with her. Suddenly, Team Rocket from another universe capture Lucario and Inteleon and disappears, with Goh and Dawn following them into the alternate world. Goh and Dawn meet the alternate Dawn, who explains that Pokémon in her world have been devolving and turning into eggs. Ash and Chloe realize that Palkia could be involved with the mysterious events. They head to a library for more information on Palkia and meet Cynthia. She informs them about Dialga, Palkia and Arceus. The alternate Team Rocket reappear and attacks them again, but eventually withdraws. Just before the gate closes, Ash and Chloe enter the other universe. While Goh and the two Dawns are researching time and space, Ash runs into an alternate version of himself.
1177	1170	42	"Showdown at the Gates of Warp! (Dialga & Palkia! The Decisive Space-time Battle!!)"; Transliteration: "Diaruga Ando Parukia! Jikū Dai Kessen!!" (Japanese: ディアルガ&パルキア！時空大決戦！！)	December 10, 2021	May 26, 2022
Ash, Chloe, along with the alternate Ash reunite with Goh and the two Dawns. Professor Rowan directs the group to the Spear Pillar, where they would be able to find Dialga and Palkia. Ash, Goh, Chloe and Dawn arrive at the Spear Pillar and find the two legendary Pokémon contained in the red chain, which is causing the distortions in time. The quartet plans to break the red chain. However, the alternate Team Rocket prevents them from doing so. Team Rocket reveals that they are the ones behind the scheme, and plan to catch Dialga and Palkia along with all of the rewound Pokémon and train them as their own. Suddenly, Dialga releases its power, causing Team Rocket to be sent blasting off and all the Pokémon reverting into eggs. Ash and the others call for Arceus' help, which eventually frees Dialga and Palkia from the red chain, and the two legendaries return everything to normal.

== Music ==
The Japanese opening song is "One, Two, Three" (1(ワン)・2(ツー)・3(スリー), Wan, Tsū, Surī) by Nishikawa-kun and Kirishō (Takanori Nishikawa and Shō Kiryūin) for 1 episode, by Karaage Sisters (Nogizaka46's Erika Ikuta and Sayuri Matsumura) for 41 episodes. The ending songs are "Pokémon Shiritori" (ポケモンしりとり, Pokemon Shiritori) by the Pokémon Music Club's Junichi Masuda, Pasocom Music Club and Pokémon Kids 2019, divided into two parts: the Pikachu → Mew Ver. (ピカチュウ→ミュウVer., Pikachū → Myū Ver.) for 11 episodes ended in even numbers, 50, 52, 54, 56, 58, 60, 62, 64, 66, 68, and 70, and the Mew → Zamazenta Ver. (ミュウ→ザマゼンタVer., Myū → Zamazenta Ver.) for 11 episodes ended in odd numbers, 49, 51, 53, 55, 57, 59, 61, 63, 65, 67, and 69, the Japanese main theme song of Pokémon the Movie: Secrets of the Jungle, "Strange and Wonderful Creatures" (ふしぎなふしぎな生きもの, Fushigi na Fushigi na Ikimono) by Tortoise Matsumoto (Ulfuls) for 6 episodes to promote the movie, "Supereffective Type" (バツグンタイプ, Batsugun Taipu) by the Pokémon Music Club's Junichi Masuda, Pasocom Music Club and Pokémon Kids 2019, divided into two parts: the Fire → Grass → Water → Rock → Fire Ver. (ほのお→くさ→みず→いわ→ほのおVer., Honō →Kusa → Mizu → Iwa → Honō Ver.) starting episode 71, and the Water → Ground → Electric → Flying → Bug Ver. (みず→じめん→でんき→ひこう→むしVer., Mizu → Jimen → Denki → Hikou → Mushi Ver.) starting episode 72, and the English opening song is "Journey to Your Heart" by Haven Paschall. Its instrumental version serves as the ending theme.
