= Pokémon: Black & White: Rival Destinies =

Fifteenth season of the Pokémon animated television series

- Season 15
- Top: English Pokémon: Black & White: Rival Destinies season title logo Bottom: Japanese Pocket Monsters: Best Wishes! Season 2 title logo
- No. of episodes: 49

Release
- Original network: TV Tokyo
- Original release: September 22, 2011 – October 4, 2012

Season chronology
- ← Previous; Black & White Next → BW: Adventures in Unova and Beyond

Pokémon: Black & White: Rival Destinies (Note: advertised as Pokémon: BW: Rival Destinies. Known in Japan as: Pocket Monsters: Best Wishes! (ポケットモンスター ベストウイッシュ, Poketto Monsutā Besuto Uisshu); Pocket Monsters: Best Wishes! Season 2 (ポケットモンスター ベストウイッシュ シーズン２, Poketto Monsutā Besuto Uisshu Shīzun Tsū)) is the fifteenth season of the Pokémon anime series and the second season of Pokémon the Series: Black & White known in Japan as Pocket Monsters: Best Wishes! (ポケットモンスター ベストウイッシュ, Poketto Monsutā Besuto Uisshu). It originally aired in Japan from September 22, 2011 to October 4, 2012, on TV Tokyo, and in the United States from February 18, 2012, to January 26, 2013, on Cartoon Network.

The season follows Ash Ketchum as he continues travelling across the Unova region with Iris and Cilan.

In Japan, the episodes comprising this season aired as part of the Best Wishes!, under two subtitles. The first thirty-six episodes were aired as the second half of Pocket Monsters: Best Wishes!, having their initial run in Japan from September 22, 2011 until June 14, 2012. The next thirteen episodes were broadcast under the subtitle Pocket Monsters: Best Wishes! Season 2, first airing in Japan on June 21 through October 4, 2012.

== Episode list ==
Jap. overall	Eng. overall	No. in season	English title Japanese title	Original release date	English air date
708	702	1	"Enter Elesa, Electrifying Gym Leader!" (The Gym Leader is a Charisma Model! Kamitsure Appears!!); Transliteration: "Jimu Rīdā wa Karisuma Moderu! Kamisure Tōjō!!" (Japanese: ジムリーダーはカリスマモデル！カミツレ登場！！)	September 22, 2011	February 18, 2012
Ash has returned to Nimbasa City and is excited to finally have his Gym Battle with Leader Elesa to earn his fourth Unova badge. However, he is next in line to Bianca, who also desires to challenge Elesa, but is forced to make a choice to continue her Pokémon Journey or go home with her father...
709	703	2	"Dazzling the Nimbasa Gym!" (Raimon Gym! Splendid Lightning Battle!!); Transliteration: "Raimon Jimu! Kareinaru Dengeki Batoru!!" (Japanese: ライモンジム！華麗なる電撃バトル！！)	September 29, 2011	February 25, 2012
Ash is planning a strategy to beat Elesa, knowing that she uses electric-type Pokémon, which are weak against ground-types.
710	704	3	"Lost at the Stamp Rally!" (Satoshi and Dent vs. the Subway Masters!); Transliteration: "Satoshi, Dento Tai Sabuwei Masutā!" (Japanese: サトシ、デントVSサブウェイマスター！)	October 6, 2011	March 3, 2012
Cilan decides that he wants to go back to the subway so he can challenge the Subway Masters Ingo and Emmet in a match by collecting enough stamps. Ash and Iris decide that they want to see the rest of Nimbasa City, but along the way, they spot a lost Axew with a bow on her tail, and must help it find its trainer.
711	705	4	"Ash Versus the Champion!" (Satoshi vs. Champion Adeku!); Transliteration: "Satoshi Tai Chanpion Adeku!" (Japanese: サトシVSチャンピオン・アデク！)	October 13, 2011	March 10, 2012
As Ash, Iris, and Cilan leave Nimbasa City, they meet back up with Trip, who reveals his inspiration came from Alder, the Unova League Champion.
712	706	5	"A Maractus Musical!" (To the Other Side of the Rainbow! Musical Maracacchi!!); Transliteration: "Niji no Kanata e! Marakatchi de Myūjikaru!!" (Japanese: 虹の彼方へ！マラカッチでミュージカル！！)	October 27, 2011	March 17, 2012
Ash is excited to have reached Driftveil City, meeting a trainer named, Tobio and his trio of Maractus, who are called, Mara, Actus, and Tussy. They are attempting to practice an "Over the Rainbow," but it fails because Tussy is afraid of heights. The gang helps Tussy to get over its fear.
713	707	6	"The Four Seasons of Sawsbuck!" (Mebukijika! Seasonal Line-Up!!); Transliteration: "Mebukijika! Shunkashūtō Seizoroi!!" (Japanese: メブキジカ！春夏秋冬勢揃い！！)	November 3, 2011	March 24, 2012
At a Pokémon Center, Ash and his friends meet Robert, a Pokémon Photographer who wants to recreate a photo of Sawsbuck through four different seasonal forms.
714	708	7	"Scraggy and the Demanding Gothita!" (Zuruggu and the Selfish Gothimu!); Transliteration: "Zuruggu to Wagamama Gochimu!" (Japanese: ズルッグとわがままゴチム！)	November 10, 2011	March 31, 2012
While on their way to Driftveil City, Ash and co. encounter a young girl named Katharine, and her Pokémon, Gothita, who has taken a liking to Ash's Scraggy due to its staring. Katharine challenges Ash to a battle, to which if she wins, he must trade his Scraggy for her Gothita.
715	709	8	"The Lonely Deino!" (Iris and Monozu! Training at the Day Care!!); Transliteration: "Airisu to Monozu! Sodateya Shugyō!!" (Japanese: アイリスとモノズ！育て屋修行！！)	November 24, 2011	April 7, 2012
Ash and Co. encounter three irate Dark & Dragon-type Pokémon named Deino, who like to cause trouble for other trainers. They soon learn that a trainer named Bobby, who runs a Pokémon Day Care, is watching over them until their trainers return. When the third Deino's trainer doesn't return, Iris expresses interest in cheering it up.
716	710	9	"The Mighty Accelguard to the Rescue!" (Happy Hero A☆gilder vs. Freege-Man!); Transliteration: "Kaiketsu A☆girudā Tai Furīji-Otoko!" (Japanese: 快傑ア☆ギルダーVSフリージ男！)	December 1, 2011	April 14, 2012
After a long time coming Ash and Co. finally arrive at Driftveil City. Ash heads to the Gym and meets Clay, the Driftveil Gym Leader. Unfortunately, Clay is too busy to have a Gym Battle and walks off. In the meantime, a local named Charles agrees to give Ash and friends a tour of Driftveil Market. But when the Thief and his Ducklett steal a fruit of apples from the market, there's evil afoot, the mighty Accelgor appears on the scene. But who is this mysterious hero?
717	711	10	"A Call for Brotherly Love!" (Dent and Pod's Brother Battle! Baoppu vs. Yanappu!!); Transliteration: "Dento to Poddo Kyōdai Batoru! Baoppu Tai Yanappu!!" (Japanese: デントとポッド兄弟バトル！バオップVSヤナップ！！)	December 8, 2011	April 21, 2012
Ash and Co. are visited by Cilan's brother, Chili, who wants to be better than his connoisseur brother after always losing so many challenges. So he decides to put his skills against Cilan by having a battle as Chili uses Pansear while Cilan uses Pansage.
718	712	11	"Stopping the Rage of Legends!: Part 1" (Tornelos vs. Voltolos vs. Landlos! (Part 1)); Transliteration: "Torunerosu Tai Borutorosu Tai Randorosu! (Zenpen)" (Japanese: トルネロスVSボルトロスVSランドロス！（前編）)	December 15, 2011	April 28, 2012
Clay states that he cannot battle Ash because he ran out of Revival Herbs. Ash and co. decide to help find these Revival Herbs, which can only be found on the Island of Legend where the Kami Trio lives. After Ash and co. arrive on the island for a day, Tornadus, the Cyclone Pokémon and Thundurus, the Bolt Strike Pokémon, appear in such a rage and attack them due to the fact their shrines are desecrated, causing them to rage fiercely for a very long time. The only Pokémon that can stop these two is the Abundance Pokémon, Landorus.
719	713	12	"Stopping the Rage of Legends!: Part 2" (Tornelos vs. Voltolos vs. Landlos! (Part 2)); Transliteration: "Torunerosu Tai Borutorosu Tai Randorosu! (Kōhen)" (Japanese: トルネロスVSボルトロスVSランドロス！（後編）)	December 22, 2011	May 5, 2012
Landorus is summoned and has been awoken by Ash and Co. as he goes up to stop the battle between Tornadus and Thundurus in the skies. Little do Ash and co. know that it was Team Rocket's plan to force the trio out of hiding so they could capture them.
720	714	13	"Battling the King of the Mines!" (Underground Gym Battle! Vs. Yacon!!); Transliteration: "Chitei no Jimu Sen! Tai Yākon!!" (Japanese: 地底のジム戦！VSヤーコン！！)	January 5, 2012	May 12, 2012
After having his request for a gym battle refused twice, Ash finally gets his chance to challenge Gym Leader Clay after helping him find more Revival Herbs.
721	715	14	"Crisis at Chargestone Cave!" (Bachuru, Dentula! Electric Rock Cave!!); Transliteration: "Bachuru, Denchura! Denkiishi no Horaana!!" (Japanese: バチュル、デンチュラ！電気石の洞穴！！)	January 12, 2012	May 19, 2012
After earning the Quake Badge, Ash and Co. decide to head to Mistralton City next. Along the way, however, Ash notices Pikachu has fallen ill, and soon learns that a Joltik was feeding off Pikachu's electricity, as well as Iris' Emolga and Cilan's Stunfisk (being part electric). They eventually find out that Team Rocket is behind this phenomenon, as part of a plan to steal rocks in the cave.
722	716	15	"Evolution Exchange Excitement!" (The Trade Evolution! Chevargo and Agilder!!); Transliteration: "Tsūshin Kōkan Shinka! Shubarugo to Agirudā!!" (Japanese: 通信交換進化！シュバルゴとアギルダー！！)	January 19, 2012	May 26, 2012
Bianca trades her Shelmet for an Escavalier that Professor Juniper caught as a Karrablast, but not without having a battle to record the data of Shelmet and Karrablast first. However, the battle is halted when a Klinklang with its gears stuck causes a sudden electrical wave comes from the cavern.
723	717	16	"Explorers of the Hero's Ruin!" (The Ruins of the Black Hero! Symboler and Desukarn!!); Transliteration: "Kuroki Eiyū no Iseki! Shinborā to Desukān!!" (Japanese: 黒き英雄の遺跡！シンボラーとデスカーン！！)	January 26, 2012	June 2, 2012
Professor Juniper's father, Cedric Juniper, found some ruins in a cave and needs help to investigate. Ash and Iris were more than excited to help when they find out the temple had a link to the Legendary Pokémon, Zekrom, and the hero whose heart becomes one with the Pokémon. As they make their way through, they get themselves into trouble when a Sigilyph and a group of Cofagrigus attacks them as Cedric took the Golden Dark Stone.
724	718	17	"Battling the Bully!" (Double Battle! Pikachu and Waruvile vs. Pendror and Gamageroge!!); Transliteration: "Daburu Batoru! Pikachū, Warubiru Tai Pendorā, Gamageroge!!" (Japanese: ダブルバトル！ピカチュウ・ワルビルVSペンドラー・ガマゲロゲ！！)	February 2, 2012	June 9, 2012
The Sunglasses Krokorok has returned once again to challenge Ash to a battle bent on defeating his rival, Pikachu, after following them through the past areas Ash and Co. have been to. During the battle, Krokorok got blasted off while Pikachu is knocked for a loop and is seen rolling into the next town, where Pikachu is found by a little boy named Mick who apparently has no confidence in himself.
725	719	18	"Baffling the Bouffalant!" (Afro is a GO! Buffalon is a NO!!); Transliteration: "Afuro de Gō! Baffuron wa Nō!!" (Japanese: アフロでGO！バッフロンはNO！！)	February 16, 2012	June 16, 2012
With Mistralton City just a few yards away, Ash and co. take a break, but his Oshawott starts a fight with Tepig by stealing a piece of his Pokémon food. Their fighting gets them attacked by a wild Bouffalant. Iris, Snivy, Oshawott, Tepig and Axew are separated from Ash and Cilan while trying to get away. She finds a Nurse Joy wearing a curly wig, who explains that the Bouffalant won't attack anyone who has a curly wig because it would think that their part of the herd. So, Iris, Oshawott, Tepig, Axew and Snivy must swallow their pride and wear curly wigs in order to make their way back to Ash and Cilan.
726	720	19	"Cilan Takes Flight!" (Fukiyose Gym's Air Battle! Challenger Dent!?); Transliteration: "Fukiyose Jimu no Ea Batoru! Chōsensha Dento!?" (Japanese: フキヨセジムのエアバトル！挑戦者デント！？)	February 23, 2012	June 23, 2012
Ash and Co. finally arrive at Mistralton City, where Ash plans on challenging the Gym Leader, Skyla, but Miles, the previous Gym Leader, and Skyla's grandfather, says that she knows how the battle will turn out without having an actual battle. She develops an imaginary battle which she calls the "Air Battle," a type of battle reserved only for flying-type Pokémon. With so many trainers flocking to challenge her, Cilan also decides to challenge her to an actual battle to prove that her "Air Battles" are wrong in which he never tolerates any kind of battle she does.
727	721	20	"An Amazing Aerial Battle!" (Fukiyose Gym! Vs. Fūro Mid-Air Match!!); Transliteration: "Fukiyose Jimu! Tai Fūro Kūchū Kessen!!" (Japanese: フキヨセジム！VSフウロ空中決戦！！)	March 1, 2012	June 30, 2012
After Cilan loses to Skyla, Ash challenges her to a battle to earn the Jet Badge. However, Skyla predicts she will win because of her technique.
728	722	21	"Climbing the Tower of Success!" (Breakthrough Challenge!! Climb the Tower of Heaven!!); Transliteration: "Nankan Toppa!! Tenkū no Tō o Nobore!!" (Japanese: 難関突破！！天空の塔を登れ！！)	March 8, 2012	July 7, 2012
Ash and friends bump into Stephan, who is in town to compete in the Bell of Wishes Festival that is being held that day. Ash, Iris, and Cilan, after finding out that the winner gets to ring the bell atop Mistralton Tower and get a wish granted, decide to compete in the festival.
729	723	22	"The Clubsplosion Begins!" (The Donamite Begins! Zuruggu vs. Yanakkie!!); Transliteration: "Donnamaito Kaimaku! Zuruggu tai Yanakkī!!" (Japanese: ドンナマイト開幕！ズルッグＶＳヤナッキー！！)	March 15, 2012	July 14, 2012
At Ambiga Town, the local Don George holds a tournament called "Clubsplosion" to showcase Fighting-Type Pokémon, but all are welcome. Ash, Stephan, Bianca, Trip, and Georgia all enter the tournament, with Ash using his Scraggy. Ash and Scraggy's first opponent is Angus and his Simisage.
730	724	23	"Search for the Clubultimate!" (The Continuing Donamite! Crimgan vs. Kirikizan!!); Transliteration: "Dondon Tsuzuku yo Donnamaito! Kurimugan tai Kirikizan!!" (Japanese: どんどん続くよドンナマイト！クリムガンＶＳキリキザン！！)	March 22, 2012	July 21, 2012
The Clubsplosion tournament continues. Iris and Excadrill face off against Burgundy and Dewott. Bianca and Emboar face off against Trip and Conkeldurr. And Dragon Buster Georgia and Bisharp face off against newcomer Gale and her Druddigon.
731	725	24	"A Clubsplosion of Excitement!" (The Burning Fights of Donamite! Kirikizan vs. Enbuoh!!); Transliteration: "Nettō Donnamaito! Kirikizan tai Enbuō!!" (Japanese: 熱闘ドンナマイト！キリキザンVSエンブオー！！)	March 29, 2012	July 28, 2012
The first round of the Clubsplosion tournament ends with Bianca's and Trip's battle. As the second round gets underway, the remaining contestants battle for the chance to enter the Top 4 in the Clubsplosion semi-finals.
732	726	25	"Commanding the Clubsplosion Crown!" (The Donamite Deciding Match! Nageki vs. Dageki!!); Transliteration: "Kessen Donnamaito! Nageki tai Dageki!!" (Japanese: 決戦ドンナマイト！ナゲキVSダゲキ！！)	April 5, 2012	August 4, 2012
The Clubsplosion semifinals rage on. Bianca and Emboar battle Stephan and Sawk, while Ash and Scraggy battle Montgomery and his Throh. In the finals, Stephan and Sawk face Montgomery and Throh. Who will win the Clubsplosion Tournament?
733	727	26	"Battling the Leaf Thieves!" (Rescue Kibago! The Den of Durant!!); Transliteration: "Kibago Kyūshutsu! Aianto no Sōkutsu!!" (Japanese: キバゴ救出！アイアントの巣窟！！)	April 12, 2012	August 11, 2012
During a practice match against Iris' Emolga, Ash's Swadloon evolves into Leavanny. Leavanny's leaf-sewing process causes it to make costumes for the other Pokémon, but this causes Axew to be accidentally kidnapped by a pair of Durant who are building a den.
734	728	27	"A Restoration Confrontation!: Part 1" (The Fierce Fight at Mount Neji! Abagoura's Miracle!! (Part 1)); Transliteration: "Nejiyama no Gekitō! Abagōra no Kiseki!! (Zenpen)" (Japanese: ネジ山の激闘！アバゴーラの奇跡！！（前編）)	April 19, 2012	August 18, 2012
Ash, Cilan, and Iris make their way to Twist Mountain where they come across a fossil dig that has discovered a fossil Tirtouga. However, Team Rocket arrives and steals the fossil to plot an attempt to travel through the time gate in Twist Mountain.
735	729	28	"A Restoration Confrontation!: Part 2" (The Fierce Fight at Mount Neji! Abagoura's Miracle!! (Part 2)); Transliteration: "Nejiyama no Gekitō! Abagōra no Kiseki!! (Kōhen)" (Japanese: ネジ山の激闘！アバゴーラの奇跡！！（後編）)	April 26, 2012	August 25, 2012
The adventure at Mount Twist with Tirtouga continues. Will Team Rocket be stopped?
736	730	29	"Evolution by Fire!" (The Memory of Flames! Pokabu vs. Enbuoh!!); Transliteration: "Honō no Memorī! Pokabu tai Enbuō!!" (Japanese: 炎のメモリー！ポカブＶＳエンブオー！！)	May 3, 2012	September 1, 2012
Ash meets his Tepig's former Trainer, Shamus, who abandoned Tepig because he felt he was too weak. Angry, Ash challenges Shamus to a double battle with Snivy and Tepig going up against Shamus's Emboar and Heatmor.
737	731	30	"Guarding the Guardian of the Mountain!" (Hachiku Appears! Ulgamoth's Holy Mountain!!); Transliteration: "Hachiku Tōjō! Urugamosu no Seinaru Yama!!" (Japanese: ハチク登場！ウルガモスの聖なる山！！)	May 10, 2012	September 8, 2012
Ash, Iris, and Cilan finally arrive in Icirus City. But before Ash can challenge movie star Brycen and his Beartic for his next Gym Badge, they must help Brycen save Volcarona from the Pokémon Hunter Rizzo and his two Jellicent.
738	732	31	"Caution: Icy Battle Conditions!" (Sekka Gym Battle! The Icy Battlefield!!); Transliteration: "Sekka Jimu Sen! Kōri no Batorufīrudo!!" (Japanese: セッカジム戦！氷のバトルフィールド！！)	May 17, 2012	September 15, 2012
Ash challenges Brycen for the Freeze Badge, putting Scraggy, Krokorok, and Pignite up against Vanillish, Cryogonal, and Beartic.
739	733	32	"Clash of the Connoisseurs!" (Pokémon Sommelier Showdown! Tasting Battle!!); Transliteration: "Pokemon Somurie Taiketsu! Teisutingu Batoru!!" (Japanese: ポケモンソムリエ対決！テイスティングバトル！！)	May 24, 2012	September 22, 2012
With only one more badge left, the group heads to Opelucid City so Ash can challenge the Gym Leader. Unfortunately for Ash, the Gym in Opelucid City is closed. When the group stops in Stonesthrow Town, Cilan meets little Marigold who is picking out her first Pokémon today. Cilan offers his skills as Pokémon Connoisseur, but another A-Class Connoisseur named Ricard Nouveau offers up his services instead of Cilan's, and they have a battle to determine who is the better Connoisseur. All while the S-Class Connoisseur Fauxgundy watches, but they believe they have seen her somewhere before.
740	734	33	"Crisis at Ferroseed Research!" (Tesseed Institute! Airis and Bivanilla!!); Transliteration: "Tesshīdo Kenkyūjo! Airisu to Baibanira!!" (Japanese: テッシード研究所！アイリスとバイバニラ！！)	May 31, 2012	September 29, 2012
The group meets up with Dragon Buster Georgia who has a Vanilluxe now. They travel to the Ferroseed Institute to see the Moss Pokémon Ferroseed being studied, but when an accident forces an evacuation, Iris, her Axew, Ash's Oshawott, and Georgia's Vanilluxe are trapped inside. Iris has not yet overcome her crippling phobia of Ice-Types, and she must figure out a way out with Vanilluxe at her side.
741	735	34	"An Epic Defense Force!" (Movie Showdown! Sortie Out Isshu Defence Forces!!); Transliteration: "Eiga Taiketsu! Shutsugeki Isshu Bōeitai!!" (Japanese: 映画対決！出撃イッシュ防衛隊！！)	June 7, 2012	October 6, 2012
After Ash and the gang arrive in Virbank City and Cilan gives them a rundown of the area’s history, they run into their filmmaking friend Luke and his Zorua! Luke plans on entering the Pokéstar Studios Movie contest and wants Ash, Iris and Cilan to help make the greatest film about the Unova Defense Force against his rival film director Jules and his Krookodile.
742	736	35	"Rocking the Virbank Gym!: Part 1" (Fierce Battle at Tachiwaki Gym! Vs. Homika!! (Part 1)); Transliteration: "Gekitō Tachiwaki Jimu! Bui Esu Homika!! (Zenpen)" (Japanese: 激闘タチワキジム！VSホミカ！！（前編）)	June 14, 2012	October 13, 2012
Ash heads to Virbank City to face off against its Gym Leader, punk rocker Roxie from the band Koffing and the Toxics, in order to obtain his eighth Gym Badge.
743	737	36	"Rocking the Virbank Gym!: Part 2" (Fierce Battle at Tachiwaki Gym! Vs. Homika!! (Part 2)); Transliteration: "Gekitō Tachiwaki Jimu! Bui Esu Homika!! (Kōhen)" (Japanese: 激闘タチワキジム！VSホミカ！！（後編）)	June 14, 2012	October 20, 2012
Ash's battle against Roxie for the Toxic Badge continues.
744	738	37	"All for the Love of Meloetta!" (Sing Meloetta! Love's Melody!!); Transliteration: "Utae Meroetta! Ai no Senritsu!!" (Japanese: 歌えメロエッタ！愛の旋律！！)	June 21, 2012 (Note: This episode began Best Wishes! Season 2 in Japan.)	October 27, 2012
After learning the Unova League will not be held for three more months, Ash, Iris, and Clian meet up with Cynthia, the reigning Sinnoh League Champion. She says she has come to Unova to participate in an exhibition match at the Pokémon World Tournament Junior Cup, held in Lacunosa Town, and Ash learns that the prize of the tournament is a battle with Alder, the reigning Unova League Champion. As the four head out of Virbank City for Undella Town, they come across the Mythical Pokémon, Meloetta. who seems to have fallen ill. However, Team Rocket are also after her, and are able to see her even when she turns invisible as well.
745	739	38	"Piplup, Pansage, and a Meeting of the Times!" (Pochama vs. Yanappu! The Magnificent Battle!!); Transliteration: "Potchama Tai Yanappu! Karei naru Batoru!!" (Japanese: ポッチャマＶＳヤナップ！華麗なるバトル！！)	June 28, 2012	November 3, 2012
Upon arriving in Undella Town, Cynthia leads the gang to her villa where Dawn and Piplup are waiting for them. Dawn has come to Unova to perfect her Pokémon Coordinator skills, and Cilan decides to have a Tasting Battle to see exactly what she can do.
746	740	39	"Expedition to Onix Island!" (Survival on the Island of Iwark!); Transliteration: "Iwāku no Shima de Sabaibaru!" (Japanese: イワークの島でサバイバル！)	July 5, 2012	November 10, 2012
While Cynthia is preparing for the Junior Cup, Ash, Cilan, Iris, and Dawn take a trip to an uninhabited island for some relaxation. However, they soon discover the island is home to several Onix that begin to attack them.
747	741	40	"The Mystery of the Missing Cubchoo!" (Sommelier Detective Dent! The Mystery of the Missing Kumasyun!!); Transliteration: "Somurie Tantei Dento! Kieta Kumashun no Nazo!!" (Japanese: ソムリエ探偵デント！消えたクマシュンの謎！！)	July 19, 2012	November 17, 2012
While in Undella Town, Cilan helps a boy named Chris track down his missing Cubchoo. However, they instead find a roaming Beartic that might have once been Chris's Cubchoo.
748	742	41	"Iris and the Rogue Dragonite!" (Iris and the Roughneck Kairyu!); Transliteration: "Airisu to Abaremono Kairyū!" (Japanese: アイリスと暴れ者カイリュー！)	July 26, 2012	November 24, 2012
When the power goes out in Undella Town, the gang tries to help out when they discover a rampaging Dragonite may be to blame. When Iris discovers the Dragonite, she believes it is truly not bad but she is soon trapped in the room with the Dragonite along with Ash's Oshawott and Dawn's Piplup.
749	743	42	"Jostling for the Junior Cup!" (Junior Cup Opener! Kairyu vs. Tunbear!!); Transliteration: "Junia Kappu Kaimaku! Kairyū tai Tsunbeā!!" (Japanese: ジュニアカップ開幕！カイリューＶＳツンベアー！！)	August 2, 2012	December 1, 2012
The Pokémon World Tournament Junior Cup begins, with rivals such as Trip, Georgia, and Burgundy showing up to take part in the tournament. After an exhibition match between Sinnoh League Champion Cynthia's Garchomp and Unova Elite Four member Caitlin's Gothitelle ends in a draw with no official winner, the first round begins. Iris is up first against Georgia, with Iris's newly captured Dragonite being pitted up against Georgia's Beartic.
750	744	43	"Battling Authority Once Again!" (Power Battle! Iris vs. Hikari!!); Transliteration: "Pawā Batoru! Airisu tai Hikari!!" (Japanese: パワーバトル！アイ リスＶＳヒカリ！！)	August 23, 2012	December 8, 2012
The quarter-final matches of the Junior Cup take place, and Iris must go up against Dawn, pitting Dragonite against Mammoswine. In another match, Cilan and Crustle take on Trip and Serperior.
751	745	44	"Ash, Iris, and Trip: Then There Were Three!" (Satoshi, Iris, and Shooty! The Last Battle!!); Transliteration: "Satoshi, Airisu, Shūtī! Saigo no Batoru!!" (Japanese: サトシ、アイリス、シューティー！最後のバトル！！)	August 30, 2012	December 15, 2012
With the semi-finals of the Junior Cup underway, and with the grand prize of having a battle with Alder on the line, Ash, Iris, and Trip go all out.
752	746	45	"Goodbye, Junior Cup - Hello Adventure!" (The Hellos and Goodbyes of the Junior Cup!); Transliteration: "Wakare to Deai no Junia Kappu!" (Japanese: 別れと出会いのジュニアカップ！)	September 6, 2012	December 22, 2012
After Trip's defeat in the match against Alder, the Pokémon World Tournament Junior Cup draws to a close and the contestants bid each other farewell. Ash, Iris, and Cilan meet Cameron, a young naive trainer who wants to travel with them. Dawn bids farewell as well, but not before having a practice match against Ash.
753	747	46	"The Road to Humilau!" (Seigaiha Gym Battle! Mantain vs. Daikenki!!); Transliteration: "Seigaiha Jimu Sen! Mantain tai Daikenki!!" (Japanese: セイガイハジム戦！マンタインＶＳダイケンキ！！)	September 13, 2012	January 5, 2013
After being separated from each other, Ash, Iris, and Cilan help Cameron get to Humilau City where he wants to challenge Marlon for his own eighth Gym Badge.
754	748	47	"Unrest at the Nursery!" (Big Fuss at the Pokémon Daycare! Washibon and Vulchai!); Transliteration: "Pokemon Hoikuen wa Ōsawagi! Washibon to Baruchai!" (Japanese: ポケモン保育園は大騒ぎ！ワシボンとバルチャイ！)	September 20, 2012	January 12, 2013
While still staying at Cynthia's villa and training for the Unova League, Ash and the gang come across a fighting pair of Rufflet and Vullaby. It turns out they have both escaped the inexperienced Day Care Nurse, Layla. Whilst the manager is away, Ash, Iris and Cilan help Layla in the Nursery, but the ongoing conflict between the two Pokémon both craving Layla's attention continues.
755	749	48	"Meloetta and the Undersea Temple!" (Meloetta and the Undersea Temple!); Transliteration: "Meroetta to Kaitei no Shinden!" (Japanese: メロエッタと海底の神殿！)	September 27, 2012	January 19, 2013
Ash continues to train at Cynthia's villa until Ridley (a member of an ancient civilisation dedicated to protecting Meloetta) and his Golurk hear Meloetta's song and come to take Meloetta back. At first, Ridley assumes Ash is associated with the thieves, but this turns out not to be the case. Before Ridley can take Meloetta home, Team Rocket assaults the group and capture Meloetta as part of "Operation Tempest", a plot to summon the Forces of Nature using the ancient Abyssal Temple through its power and song for Team Rocket's boss Giovanni to conquer Unova. The heroes try to fend off Team Rocket, but with Giovanni himself prepared, they are too strong and he kidnaps Ash and Pikachu after defeating them with his Persian for Meloetta.
756	750	49	"Unova's Survival Crisis!" (The Therian Formes Advance! Isshu's Greatest Crisis!!); Transliteration: "Reijū Forumu Sōshingeki! Isshu Saidai no Kiki!!" (Japanese: 霊獣フォルム総進撃！イッシュ最大の危機！！)	October 4, 2012	January 26, 2013
With Meloetta in their possession, Giovanni controls Tornadus, Thundurus and Landorus in their more powerful Therian Formes through the use of the reveal glass unlocked by Meloetta's presence and Meloetta's song. Ash, Cilan, Iris, Cynthia, and Ridley do their best to free Meloetta and save the world from Team Rocket. But forces stronger than Team Rocket are present, and Giovanni soon finds himself commissioned through his evil paths when the Reveal Glass possesses him, setting Tornadus, Thundurus, and Landorus on a path to destroy Unova rather than take it over for Team Rocket.

== Music ==
The Japanese opening songs are "Best Wishes!" (ベストウイッシュ!, Besuto Uisshu!) and "Be an Arrow!" (やじるしになって!, Yajirushi ni Natte!) by Rica Matsumoto. The ending songs are "Can You Name All the Pokemon? BW" (ポケモン言えるかな? BW, Pokémon Ierukana? BW) by Takeshi Tsuruno, "Seven-colored Arch" (七色アーチ, Nanairo Āchi) by the Pokémon BW Choral Gang (Aki Okui, Toshiko Ezaki, and Fumie Akiyoshi), "Look Look☆Here" (みてみて☆こっちっち, Mite Mite☆Kotchitchi) by Momoiro Clover Z, "Team Rocket Forever" (ロケット団よ永遠に, Roketto-dan yo Eien ni) by the Team Rocket Gang, and the English opening song is "Rival Destinies" by Alex Nackman and Kathryn Raio. Its instrumental version serves as the ending theme.

== Home media releases ==
Viz Media and Warner Home Video have released the series on DVD in the United States.

The first volume was released on September 10, 2013, and the second was released on December 3, 2013, both releases were two-disc boxsets containing 12 episodes each. The third volume, released on March 18, 2014, was a four-disc boxset containing 25 episodes.

Viz Media and Warner Home Video released Pokémon: Black & White: Rival Destinies – The Complete Season on DVD on March 15, 2022.
