= Emily Bauer =

American actress

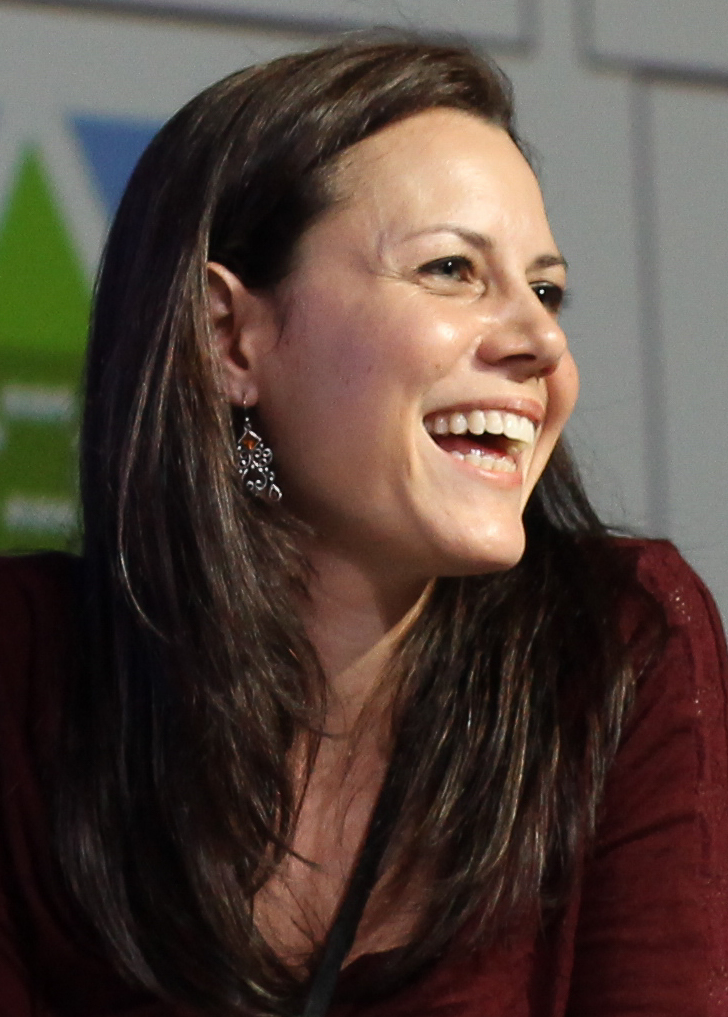
- Bauer at the 2016 Magic City Comic Con
- Born: Princeton, New Jersey, U.S.
- Other name: Emily Blau
- Education: New York University
- Occupation: Actress
- Years active: 1999–present
- Children: 2, including Mia Sinclair Jenness
- Website: www.emilybauer.com

Emily Bauer Jenness is an American voice and stage actress. She has worked in a number of English language dubs of Japanese anime shows including Shinobu in Ninja Nonsense, Megumi Morisato in Ah! My Goddess, Dawn from the Pokémon anime and Lastelle in Nausicaä of the Valley of the Wind.

== Early life ==
Growing up in Millburn, New Jersey, Bauer took dance, acting and singing classes at a local performing arts school and later performed in professional plays and musicals at the Paper Mill Playhouse. She attended Millburn High School and majored in both business and theatre at New York University. She graduated cum laude in 2002 and also received the Presidential Honors Scholar Award for maintaining one of the highest cumulative GPAs.

== Career ==
Bauer has acted in Mona Lisa Smile with Julia Roberts and Long Distance with Monica Keena. In 2005, she voiced in Nausicaä of the Valley of the Wind with Alison Lohman, Patrick Stewart and Uma Thurman. In 2007, she was cast as the lead role of Dawn and as the Sinnoh League Champion Cynthia in the Pokémon: Diamond and Pearl anime series. In 2014, Bauer voiced main character Zuzu Boyle/Ray Akaba and her counterparts in Yu-Gi-Oh! Arc-V.

Bauer has an acting studio in New Jersey and continues to participate in productions in the New York City metro area.

== Personal life ==
Bauer has two children, a son by the name of Brady Jenness and a daughter by the name of Mia Sinclair Jenness, both of whom have acting careers of their own. All three are members of the Screen Actors Guild (SAG).

== Filmography ==
Film roles
Year	Title	Role	Notes	Refs
2003	Mona Lisa Smile	Art History Student		Website
2016	Sheep and Wolves	Leah		Uncredited

Television roles (live-action)
Year	Title	Role	Notes	Refs
1999–2000	Guiding Light	Erica		Website
2001	The Education of Max Bickford	Sydney	Episode: "A Very Great Man"	Website

Voice roles
Year	Title	Role	Notes	Refs
2000	Celebrity Deathmatch	Christina Aguilera, various characters	Episode: "The New Employee"	Resume
2001	Clifford the Big Red Dog	Emily Elizabeth	Episode: "Best Paw Forward/Then Came Bob"	Website
2005–2007	Ah! My Goddess	Megumi Morisato	TV series, 2 seasons, As Emily Blau	Resume, CA
2005	Nausicaä of the Valley of the Wind	Lastelle		Resume, CA
2006	Ninja Nonsense	Shinobu	As Emily Blau	
2007–present	Pokémon	Dawn, Officer Jenny, Cynthia, Ambipom, Matori, others		Resume
2009	Black God	Riona Kogure		Resume
2014	Wallykazam!	Night Dragon, Jar of Jam	Episode: "Day in the Dark"	
2015–2018	Yu-Gi-Oh! Arc-V	Zuzu Boyle, Lulu Obsidian, Celina, Rin, Ray Akaba	Episode: "Swing into Action Part 1"	Resume

Video games
Year	Title	Role	Notes	Refs
2017	Yu-Gi-Oh! Duel Links	Zuzu Boyle		
2022	Yu-Gi-Oh! Cross Duel	Zuzu Boyle		
2026	Grand Theft Auto VI	Additional voices		

=== Audiobooks ===
- Life as We Knew It
- InCryptid series
  - Discount Armageddon (2012)
  - Midnight Blue-Light Special (2013)
  - Chaos Cheoreography (2016)
  - Magic for Nothing (2017)
  - Tricks for Free (2018)
  - That Ain't Witchcraft (2019)
  - Imaginary Numbers (2020)
  - Calculated Risks (2021)
  - Spelunking Through Hell (2022)
- Ishura
- Roll Over and Die

== Stage ==
Dates	Title	Role	Production	Notes	Refs
2002	Almost Heaven: Songs and Stories of John Denver Music Concert Tour		The Denver Center Theatre Company		
2003–04	Hair	Jeanie		35th Anniversary Theater Tour	Resume
