= Cynthia (Pokémon) =

Pokémon Champion

- Pokémon character
- Cynthia from Pokémon Diamond and Pearl
- First appearance: Pokémon Diamond and Pearl (2006)
- Voiced by: English: Emily Bauer (anime) Allegra Clark (Pokémon Masters EX) Tara Sands (Pokémon Generations); Japanese: Tomo Sakurai (anime) Mie Sonozaki (Pokémon Masters EX) Aya Endō (Pokémon Generations)

Cynthia, known in Japan as Shirona (Japanese: シロナ), is a fictional character in the 2006 video games Pokémon Diamond and Pearl, where she appears as a supporting character and as the game's final boss. She appears at various points in the game, before being encountered as the Sinnoh League Champion. She has since appeared in other games, including re-releases of Diamond and Pearl, accompanied by her Garchomp and Lucario. She also appears in the Pokémon Adventures manga and Pokémon anime in a similar capacity. In the anime, she reappeared as part of a Tournament of Champions and a member of Masters Eight, facing off against the anime series' main protagonist Ash Ketchum.

Cynthia was well received by critics and audiences and has been noted as one of the most difficult bosses in video game history. Her surprise appearance in Black and White, as well as Black 2 and White 2, has been compared to that of a jump scare, leading to memes in response.

== Concept and creation ==
Developed by Game Freak and published by Nintendo, the Pokémon franchise began in Japan in 1996 with the release of the video games Pokémon Red and Blue for the Game Boy. In these games, the player assumes the role of a Pokémon Trainer whose goal is to capture and train creatures called Pokémon. Players use the creatures' special abilities for combat, both in the wild as well as in matches against other Trainers. Cynthia is the Champion of the Elite Four Pokémon Diamond and Pearl (2006), Pokemon Platinum (2008), and Pokemon Brilliant Diamond and Shining Pearl (2021). Trainers must defeat each member of the Elite Four before they are able to face off against her.

Cynthia is voiced by Tomo Sakurai in Japanese and primarily by Emily Bauer in English. Sakurai was surprised by the opportunity to reprise the role in her 2021 appearance in the Pokemon anime, expressing gratitude for both fans of the series and Cynthia. In the video game Pokémon Masters, she is voiced by Mie Sonozaki in Japanese and Allegra Clark in English.

== Appearances ==
Cynthia first appeared in Pokémon Diamond and Pearl. She is a Pokémon Archeologist traveling across the Sinnoh region researching its mythology and interacting with the player-character at various points, helping battle the villainous Team Galactic. She later appears as the game's final opponent, the Champion of the region's Elite Four, featuring multiple Pokémon such as Garchomp, a signature Pokémon of hers. In the re-release of Diamond and Pearl, titled Pokémon Platinum, she serves a similar role, though she also helps the player battle the Legendary Pokémon Giratina. In the remakes, Brilliant Diamond and Shining Pearl, her team for this battle is modified.

Cynthia appears in Pokémon HeartGold and SoulSilver as part of a special event, triggered if a certain Arceus is brought to a location called Sinjoh Ruins. She also later appears in both Pokémon Black and White and its sequels, Pokémon Black 2 and White 2, where she can be fought. She later appears as both an opponent and potential ally as part of Pokémon Ultra Sun and Ultra Moon's Battle Tree mode. She also appears in side games, such as Pokémon Masters EX and Pokémon Unite. In Pokémon Legends: Arceus, two characters, Volo and Cogita, appear to resemble Cynthia, with Volo having a similar design, music theme, and Pokémon team to Cynthia's.

Cynthia appears in the Pokémon anime series, where she is a recurring character. She first appears in Pokémon the Series: Diamond and Pearl, where she helps with stopping Team Galactic, and later reappears in Pokémon: Black & White: Rival Destinies, where she helps Ash Ketchum protect the Mythical Pokémon Meloetta. She later reappears in Pokémon Ultimate Journeys: The Series, where she takes part in the World Coronation Series and loses to Ash in the Masters Eight Tournament semi-finals.

Cynthia cameos as a minor character in the 2019 film Pokémon: Detective Pikachu, portrayed by Abbie Murphy.

== Reception ==
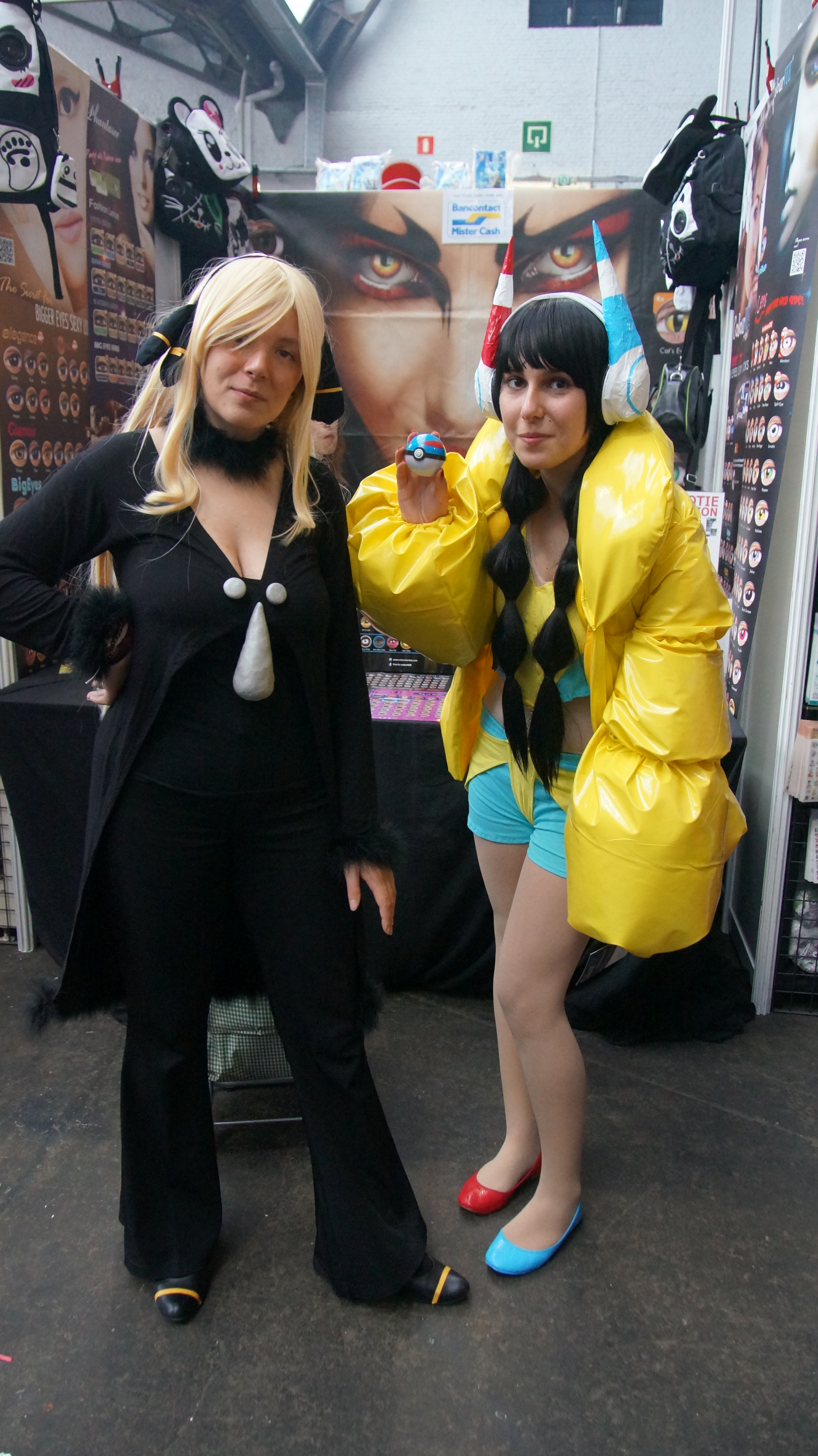
Cosplays of Cynthia (left) and Elesa (right) at the 2013 Japan Expo in Paris, France

Cynthia has been well-received as a character. She is regarded particularly due to how challenging an opponent she was. Kotaku writer Kenneth Shepard considered her the best Pokémon Champion in the series, calling hers the "quintessential Pokémon battle." He considered her battle intimidating, commenting that the callback to her fight in Volo's fight in Pokémon Legends: Arceus demonstrates the trauma some Pokémon fans still feel from Cynthia's team. He attributed to this being how many bases her team covers, feeling that it was the closest one would come to playing against a human player with "game sense and strategy." Shepard also praised how difficult her fight was, saying that it reminded him of the exhilaration he felt playing Pokémon as a child, and how "sweet" it would be to beat her after training up his Pokémon. Game Rant writer Drew Swanson discussed her appearance in Black and White and its sequels, Black 2 and White 2, as a jump scare due both to how unexpected the encounter was and how difficult it was. She has also been noted as a notable boss in video games by GamingBolt and Shacknews. GamingBolt writer Shubhankar Parijat attributed the difficulty of her fight to her varied team. Shacknews writer Donovan Erskine called her his favorite boss battle, praising the series' tendency to keep the identity of the Champion a surprise and commenting how shocked he was when he realized Cynthia was the Champion. He further praised the difficulty and her theme, calling her the "greatest of all time." Inside Games writer Sawadee Otsuka attributed the Pokémon Garchomp's popularity in part to being a member of Cynthia's team.

Cynthia's 2021 appearance in the Pokémon anime was the subject of commentary by multiple critics. TheGamer writer Stacey Henley praised the battle between Cynthia and Iris in the anime, particularly due to her disguising her Key Stone—an item used to Mega Evolve her Garchomp—as lipstick. Describing it as "incredibly cool and incredibly stupid," she appreciated the combination of power and femininity, finding it a rare sight in popular media. Comic Book Resource writer Ryan McCarthy felt that having Ash vs. Leon as the final battle was less compelling than Cynthia fighting Leon, due to her being one of the two strongest trainers, along with Leon, particularly because neither have been shown to have lost a match. He felt that Ash getting into the finals was due to his status as the main character. Game Rant writer Levana Jane Chester-Londt speculated that Cynthia could win the World Coronation Series in the Pokémon anime due to her team's power, diversity, and rarity, analyzing her strengths and weaknesses as well as her opponents, particularly Ash and Leon.

Inside Games writer Sawadee Otsuka considered her one of the series' most popular characters, stating that her long hair and black outfit helps give her a more mature feel. They also felt that the character's popularity derived from being an adult woman and the first female Champion in the series, contending that female adult trainers were uncommon in the series. They stated that her popularity has stayed consistent in the 15 years since Diamond and Pearl's release. In a ranking of gym leaders in the Pokémon series, Otsuka noted that despite not being a gym leader, they felt compelled to include her due to significant support, only beaten by Elesa. In addition to sexiness, mysterious personality, and the difficulty of her fight as reasons for her charm, Otsuka felt that her frequent appearances helped enhance her popularity. They also noted that a large majority of her supporters were men. An Inside Games poll of its readers found that Cynthia was the most favored female character in the series. When Brilliant Diamond and Shining Pearl were slated to release, the return of Cynthia was a popular topic among fans, becoming a trending topic on Twitter. The similarities between characters like Volo and Cogita from Pokémon Legends: Arceus have been the subject of discussion. IGN writer Erick Romero discussed Volo's theme, talking about how it is based on Cynthia's, which he praises as incredible.

She was noted as a popular cosplay character by Inside Games.
