= Pokémon the Series: Diamond and Pearl =

Tenth season of the Pokémon animated television series

- Season 10
- Japanese logo (top); International logo (bottom)
- No. of episodes: 52 (Japanese version); 51 (English version)

Release
- Original network: TV Tokyo
- Original release: September 28, 2006 – October 25, 2007

Season chronology
- ← Previous; Battle Frontier Next → DP: Battle Dimension

Pokémon: Diamond and Pearl is the tenth season of the Pokémon anime series and the first and titular season of Pokémon the Series: Diamond and Pearl, known in Japan as Pocket Monsters Diamond & Pearl (ポケットモンスター ダイヤモンド&パール, Poketto Monsutā Daiyamondo & Pāru). It originally aired in Japan from September 28, 2006, to October 25, 2007, on TV Tokyo, and in the United States from April 20, 2007, to February 1, 2008, on Cartoon Network.

The season follows Ash Ketchum as he travels across the Sinnoh region to challenge its Pokémon League while joined by Brock and Dawn, another aspiring Pokémon Coordinator.

== Episode list ==
Jap. overall	Eng. overall	No. in season	English title Japanese title	Original release date	English air date
469	465	1	"Following a Maiden's Voyage!" (Setting Off! From Futaba Town to Masago Town!!); Transliteration: "Tabidachi! Futaba Taun Kara Masago Taun e!!" (Japanese: 旅立ち！フタバタウンからマサゴタウンへ！！)	September 28, 2006	April 20, 2007; June 4, 2007
Dawn, a 10-year-old girl living from Twinleaf Town in the region of Sinnoh, is aspiring to become the best Pokémon Coordinator like her mother Johanna, and sets off to the Pokémon Laboratory in Sandgem Town to get her starter Pokémon, with various events leading to her choosing Piplup as her starter. Meanwhile, Ash has arrived in Sinnoh, but a failed Team Rocket plotting to snatch Pikachu results in him falling into a forest.
470	466	2	"Two Degrees of Separation!" (Find Pikachu! Route 202!); Transliteration: "Pikachū o Sagase! 202-ban Dōro!" (Japanese: ピカチュウをさがせ！202番道路！)	September 28, 2006	April 20, 2007; June 5, 2007
Dawn, with her recently-acquired Piplup, sets her sights on Jubilife City for her first Pokémon Contest. After discovering Pikachu and first mistaking it to be a Wild Pokémon, she begins her search to find his trainer. Ash and Aipom on the meantime, is on the search for Pikachu himself with the help of a newly-caught Starly, his old friend Brock, Professor Rowan, Nurse Joy and Officer Jenny.
471	467	3	"When Pokémon Worlds Collide!" (Rival Battle! Three On Three!!); Transliteration: "Raibaru Batoru! San Tai San!!" (Japanese: ライバルバトル！三対三！！)	September 28, 2006	April 20, 2007; June 6, 2007
Ash finds and saves Pikachu in the middle of a battle with Team Rocket and their mecha. After introducing themselves, Ash and Dawn become friends and inform Professor Rowan about Pikachu being found. Meanwhile, Ash finds himself a new rival in Paul after the two butt heads with each other over their respective training methods, and the two have a three-on-three battle.
472	468	4	"Dawn of a New Era!" (Pochama Against Subomie! Hikari's First Battle!!); Transliteration: "Potchama Tai Subomī! Hikari Hatsu Batoru!!" (Japanese: ポッチャマ対スボミー！ヒカリ初バトル！！)	October 5, 2006	June 7, 2007
Ash's attempts at helping Dawn catch Pokémon isn't going too well, and the two begin arguing. Wanting to prove herself to Ash, Dawn challenges a Pokémon bard by the name of Nando to a battle. The two later find out that Nando is skilled and undecided about whether to challenge Gyms or Contests, causing Ash and Dawn to each try and persuade him to challenge their preferred competitions.
473	469	5	"Gettin' Twiggy with It!" (Naetle! I Got It!); Transliteration: "Naetoru! Getto da ze!" (Japanese: ナエトル！ゲットだぜ！)	October 19, 2006	June 11, 2007
After a Team Rocket plotting scheme goes wrong, Pikachu finds himself meeting a wild Turtwig, a carer of the Pokémon in the area it lives in. When Ash finds Pikachu, Turtwig becomes protective of Pikachu, unaware of him being Ash's Pokémon.
474	470	6	"Different Strokes for Different Blokes!" (Bewilder Forest! Shinji Returns!!); Transliteration: "Mayoi no Mori! Shinji Futatabi!!" (Japanese: 迷いの森！シンジふたたび！！)	October 26, 2006	June 12, 2007
Ash meets up with Paul again, with their rivalry increasing once Ash discovers that he releases Pokémon he sees are too weak. The two have a battle again, pitting Ash's newly caught Turtwig against Paul's Chimchar.
475	471	7	"Like it or Lup It!" (Do Your Best, Pochama!!); Transliteration: "Potchama Ganbaru!!" (Japanese: ポッチャマがんばる！！)	November 2, 2006	June 13, 2007
A group of water-type Pokémon and a Ludicolo are quabbling over some food, Piplup then discover that Team Rocket has taken it all, and must find a way to use his contest moves to retrieve it back.
476	472	8	"Gymbaliar!" (Gureggru of the Mysterious Gym!); Transliteration: "Nazo no Jimu no Guregguru!" (Japanese: なぞのジムのグレッグル！)	November 9, 2006	June 14, 2007
A girl named Minnie is convinced that the next Pokémon Gym is one operated by a woman named Princess Powerzone, who uses a Croagunk. In reality, it's a scheme ran by Team Rocket to capture Pokémon!
477	473	9	"Setting the World on its Buneary!" (Let's Play with Mimirol!?); Transliteration: "Mimiroru to Asobō!?" (Japanese: ミミロルとあそぼう！？)	November 16, 2006	June 18, 2007
A wild Buneary starts falling in love for Pikachu, and when Dawn tries to catch it, it proves quite shy.
478	474	10	"Not on My Watch Ya Don't!" (Can't Get the Pokétch!?); Transliteration: "Poketchi Nyūshu Konnan!?" (Japanese: ポケッチ入手困難！？)	November 30, 2006	June 19, 2007
Dawn seeks to acquire the popular Pokétch gadget. However Team Rocket takes advantages of this with a scheme of providing fake Pokétches that brainwash the owner's Pokémon using the voice of a Psyduck.
479	475	11	"Mounting a Coordinator Assault!" (Hikari! Contest Debut!!); Transliteration: "Hikari! Kontesuto Debyū!!" (Japanese: ヒカリ！コンテストデビュー！！)	December 7, 2006	June 20, 2007
Dawn is eager to participate in the Jubilife Pokémon Contest and meets Zoey, another girl, whom she instantly strikes a rivalry with. Ash's Aipom is also very eager to enter the contest, so Ash enters as well, in addition to a disguised Jessie.
480	476	12	"Arrival of a Rival!" (Contest Battle! Rival Showdown!!); Transliteration: "Kontesuto Batoru! Raibaru Taiketsu!!" (Japanese: コンテストバトル！ライバル対決！！)	December 14, 2006	June 21, 2007
The Jubilife Contest continues, pitting Zoey against Dawn in the semi-finals, but who will reach the final?
481	477	13	"A Staravia Is Born!" (Do Your Best, Mukkuru!); Transliteration: "Mukkuru Ganbaru!" (Japanese: ムックルがんばる！)	December 21, 2006 (Note: These episodes were broadcast as part of an hour-long special.)	June 25, 2007
Ash attempts to train his Starly. However, it ends up being captured by Team Rocket along with other bird Pokémon. However, Starly saving the day when it evolves into Staravia and masters Aerial Ace.
482	478	14	"Leave it to Brocko!" (Leave it to Takeshi!); Transliteration: "Takeshi ni Omakase!" (Japanese: タケシにおまかせ！)	December 21, 2006	June 26, 2007
Brock helps to reunite a Nuzleaf with his Strong Shiftry Brother, but Team Rocket keep getting in the way - wanting Nuzleaf for the boss. In the meantime, Brock's Bonsly evolves into a Sudowoodo, and must brave its fear of water to protect Nuzleaf.
483	479	15	"Shapes of Things to Come!" (Kurogane Gym! Hyouta vs. Shinji!!); Transliteration: "Kurogane Jimu! Hyōta Tai Shinji!!" (Japanese: クロガネジム！ヒョウタVSシンジ！！)	January 11, 2007	June 27, 2007
Ash has arrived at the Oreburgh Gym, but the Rock-type Gym Leader, Roark, has a match already scheduled with Paul. Paul battles using all the methods that Ash doesn't like, but will he win the Coal Badge?
484	480	16	"A Gruff Act to Follow!" (Zugaidos vs. Pikachu!); Transliteration: "Zugaidosu Tai Pikachū!" (Japanese: ズガイドスVSピカチュウ！)	January 18, 2007	June 28, 2007
Ash is still angry with Paul with his battle methods after he gives away his Azumarill to a young boy, and tries to prove to him that his own nicer tactics can defeat Roark's strong Rock-type Pokémon.
485	481	17	"Wild in the Streets!" (Big Charge of Ancient Pokémon!!); Transliteration: "Kodai Pokemon Daishingeki!!" (Japanese: 古代ポケモン大進撃！！)	January 25, 2007	July 2, 2007
While Ash trains for a rematch with Roark, Team Rocket schemes to acquire a fossil Pokémon. Once an Aerodactyl is revived, several more ancient Pokémon break out. It takes Dawn's new combo and Roark's newly evolved Rampardos to completely stop them, leading to a new style of training.
486	482	18	"O'er the Rampardos We Watched!" (Return to Kurogane Gym! Decisive Battle with Rampard!!); Transliteration: "Kurogane Jimu Futatabi! Kessen Ramuparudo!!" (Japanese: クロガネジムふたたび！決戦ラムパルド！！)	February 1, 2007	July 3, 2007
During his rematch with Roark, can Ash make good use of a move performed by Dawn's Pokémon to defeat Roark's newly evolved Rampardos?
487	483	19	"Twice Smitten, Once Shy!" (Get Pachirisu... No Need to Worry!?); Transliteration: "Pachirisu Getto de...Daijōbu!?" (Japanese: パチリスゲットで…大丈夫！？)	February 8, 2007	July 5, 2007
The gang come across a very hyperactive Pachirisu. But when Dawn captures it, it has her questioning her capabilities as a trainer when her attempts to control it fail.
488	484	20	"Mutiny in the Bounty!" (Pokémon Hunter J!); Transliteration: "Pokémon Hantā Jē!" (Japanese: ポケモンハンターJ！)	February 22, 2007	July 9, 2007
Ash and his friends meet Pokémon Hunter J, a cold-blooded woman who sells Pokémon to the highest bidders for money. When she kidnaps Pikachu and Meowth, the gang forge an alliance with Team Rocket to get them both back.
489	485	21	"Ya See We Want an Evolution!" (The Strongest Koiking and the Most Beautiful Hinbass!); Transliteration: "Saikyō no Koikingu to Mottomo Utsukushī Hinbasu!" (Japanese: 最強のコイキングと最も美しいヒンバス！)	March 1, 2007	July 10, 2007
Ash and his friends meet the B-button league, a duo who own the most powerful Magikarp and the most beautiful Feebas there could be, and refuse to evolve them. Meanwhile, Team Rocket use an Evolving Machine they bought from the Magikarp Salesman to kidnap them - and Pikachu, and attempt to evolve them.
490	486	22	"Borrowing on Bad Faith!" (Pachirisu vs. Eipom! Contest Battle!!); Transliteration: "Pachirisu Tai Eipamu! Kontesuto Batoru!!" (Japanese: パチリスVSエイパム！コンテストバトル！！)	March 8, 2007	July 11, 2007
On their way to Floaroma Town, an unofficial Pokémon Contest is being held, with Dawn using her new Pachirisu, while Jessie borrows Ash's Aipom, which Ash is uncertain about.
491	487	23	"Faced with Steelix Determination!" (Roaring Haganeil! Protect the Bipper Village!!); Transliteration: "Bakusō Haganēru! Bippa no Mura o Mamore!!" (Japanese: 爆走ハガネール！ビッパの村を守れ！！)	March 15, 2007	July 12, 2007
When Ash find an injured Bidoof, they are attacked by a rampaging Steelix, who Team Rocket accidentally jam shovels into.
492	488	24	"Cooking Up a Sweet Story!" (Showdown! Satoshi Against Pikachu!?); Transliteration: "Taiketsu! Satoshi Tai Pikachū!?" (Japanese: 対決！サトシ対ピカチュウ！？)	March 29, 2007	July 16, 2007
Ash and his friends receive a request from a young woman named Teresa who wants to borrow Ash's Pikachu. She's in trouble because her Aunt Abigail's Pikachu (nicknamed Sugar), who helped make cakes in her cake store, has suddenly disappeared.
493	489	25	"Oh Do You Know the Poffin Plan!" (The Gifted Roserade and the Flower Legend!); Transliteration: "Kaiketsu Rozureido to Hana Densetsu!" (Japanese: 怪傑ロズレイドと花伝説！)	March 29, 2007	September 1, 2007
Ash and his friends arrive at Floaroma Town. They hear that a class has been opened within the town which teaches how to make the "Pokémon snack", Poffin. They try to make their first Poffin with the help of Forsythia and her seemingly shy Roserade, but things aren't going right.
494	490	26	"Getting the Pre-Contest Titters!" (Pokémon Contest! Sonoo Tournament!!); Transliteration: "Pokemon Kontesuto! Sonō Taikai!!" (Japanese: ポケモンコンテスト！ソノオ大会！！)	April 5, 2007	September 1, 2007
It's the day before the Floaroma Town content, and Dawn meets up with her childhood friend Kenny, who gets keen eyes on Ash and decides to battle him.
495	491	27	"Settling a Not-So-Old Score!" (Decisive Battle! Pochama vs. Pottaishi!!); Transliteration: "Kessen! Potchama Tai Pottaishi!!" (Japanese: 決戦！ポッチャマVSポッタイシ！！)	April 5, 2007	September 8, 2007
As the Floaroma Town Contest continues, Dawn and Kenny make it to the finals, leaving the contest battle with Piplup versus its evolved form, Prinplup. Who will win the ribbon?
496	492	28	"Drifloon on the Wind!" (Fuwante and the North Wind Messenger!); Transliteration: "Fuwante to Kitakaze no Tsukai!" (Japanese: フワンテと北風の使い！)	April 12, 2007	September 15, 2007
Ash and his friends run into a Nurse Joy at a Pokémon Center with their pack of Drifloon owned by her daughters - Marnie and Paige. When a failed Team Rocket plot to capture Ampharos blacks out the Valley Windworks, and a gust of wind sends Paige and Pikachu flying away, Marnie must rely with the help of her special friend Suicune to rescue her twin sister and Pikachu.
497	493	29	"The Champ Twins!" (Satoshi and Hikari! No Need to Worry in a Tag Battle!?); Transliteration: "Satoshi to Hikari! Taggu Batoru de Daijōbu!?" (Japanese: サトシとヒカリ！タッグバトルで大丈夫！？)	April 12, 2007	September 22, 2007
Ash and Dawn (with their Turtwig and Piplup) have their first tag team battle with the Champ Twins - Brian and Ryan, that gets recorded for reporter Rhonda's "Sinnoh Now" TV program. However, they begin to fight, and end up losing. Can Ash and Dawn learn how to work as a team?
498	494	30	"Some Enchanted Sweetening!" (Hakutai Forest! Minomutchi Evolution Strategy!!); Transliteration: "Hakutai no Mori! Minomutchi Shinka Sakusen!!" (Japanese: ハクタイの森！ミノムッチ進化作戦！！)	April 19, 2007	September 29, 2007
Ash and the gang meet Cheryl, a female treasure hunter traveling through Eterna Forest, in search of the Enchanted Honey, together with her Chansey. She captures a Male Burmy, since she needs it to evolve into a Mothim in order to get the Enchanted Honey at the Amber Castle.
499	495	31	"The Grass-Type is Always Greener!" (Naetle Against Naetle! Speed Showdown!!); Transliteration: "Naetoru Tai Naetoru! Supīdo Taiketsu!!" (Japanese: ナエトル対ナエトル！スピード対決！！)	April 26, 2007	October 6, 2007
Ash and his friends continue their search for the Enchanted Honey. During their journey, they meet Gardenia, the Gym Leader of Eterna City, where Ash has a practice battle with her, but Ash's Turtwig proves no match against Gardenia's Pokémon.
500	496	32	"An Angry Combeenation!" (Beequeen of the Amber Castle!); Transliteration: "Kohaku no Shiro no Bīkuin!" (Japanese: 琥珀の城のビークイン！)	May 3, 2007	October 13, 2007
The quest for the Enchanted Honey concludes as our heroes arrive at Amber Castle, home to a hive of Combee and their leader, Queen Vespiquen.
501	497	33	"All Dressed Up with Somewhere to Go!" (It's Love! Pokémon Transformation Tournament!!); Transliteration: "Suki Desu! Pokemon Narikiri Taikai!!" (Japanese: スキです！ポケモンなりきり大会！！)	May 10, 2007	October 20, 2007
Ash and his friends compete in the Sinnoh Pokémon Dress-up contest where a Pokémon must imitate another to win the prize; a Pokémon Egg.
502	498	34	"Buizel Your Way Out of This!" (Buoysel! Road to Being the Strongest!!); Transliteration: "Buizeru! Saikyō e no michi!" (Japanese: ブイゼル！最強への道！！)	May 17, 2007	October 27, 2007
Ash and his friends encounter a wild Buizel, with Ash, Dawn and Zoey seeking to catch it.
503	499	35	"An Elite Meet and Greet!" (Elite Four Goyō and Dotakun!); Transliteration: "Shitennō Goyō to Dōtakun!" (Japanese: 四天王ゴヨウとドータクン！)	May 24, 2007	November 3, 2007
Ash and his friends meet up with Lucian, a Psychic Pokémon enthusiast and one of Sinnoh's Elite Four. Dawn decides to test her luck against Lucian's Bronzong with her newly caught Buizel, but Buizel will not listen to any of Dawn's commands.
504	500	36	"A Secret Sphere of Influence!" (Sinnoh's Space-time Legend!); Transliteration: "Shin'ō Jikū Densetsu!" (Japanese: シンオウ時空伝説！)	May 31, 2007	November 10, 2007
The Adamant Orb is stolen from the Eterna City Museum, and the wandering minstrel Nando is accused for the crime by the local Officer Jenny (who has a Stunky). Ash and his friends, along with Gym Leader Gardenia and the Viridian City Officer Jenny, attempt to locate the true thieves.
505	501	37	"The Grass Menagerie!" (Hakutai Gym! Vs. Natane!!); Transliteration: "Hakutai Jimu! Tai Natane!!" (Japanese: ハクタイジム！VSナタネ！！)	June 7, 2007	November 17, 2007
Ash finally has a Gym Battle with Gardenia, the Eterna City Gym Leader, in a 3-on-3 fight to the finish.
506	502	38	"One Big Happiny Family!" (Explosive Birth! Cycling Road!!); Transliteration: "Bakutan! Saikuringu Rōdo!!" (Japanese: 爆誕！サイクリングロード！！)	June 21, 2007	November 24, 2007
The gang find themselves at a mostly abandoned Pokémon Center ran by a Nurse Joy who has the blues of her center not being used a lot. However, when she finds out that Brock's egg is about to hatch, she is able to prove her usefulness as the Egg hatches into a Happiny.
507	503	39	"Steamboat Willies!" (Pikachu's Caretaking!); Transliteration: "Pikachū no Orusuban!" (Japanese: ピカチュウのおるすばん！)	July 5, 2007	December 1, 2007
Ash and his friends decide to make a trip on a ship for tourists. They call out all of their Pokémon to show them the beautiful view they have from inside. Since there's still a lot of time left before the ship takes off, the group decide to do some shopping nearby, leaving the Pokémon alone on board. The situation ends in chaos.
508	504	40	"Top-Down Training!" (Champion – Shirona Appears!!); Transliteration: "Champion, Shirona Tōjō!!" (Japanese: チャンピオン・シロナ登場！！)	July 19, 2007	December 8, 2007
Ash and his friends encounter Cynthia, the Sinnoh League Champion, just as she is about to begin a battle with Ash's rival, Paul, who reveals that he has been competing in four regions, and shows his very first Pokémon - Torterra, having evolved from his Turtwig. When Paul decides to challenge Cynthia, none of his Pokémon prove any match for Cynthia's Garchomp.
509	505	41	"A Stand-Up Sit-Down!" (Hikari, Nozomi and the Double Performance!!); Transliteration: "Hikari to Nozomi to Daburu Pafōmansu!!" (Japanese: ヒカリとノゾミとダブルパフォーマンス！！)	July 26, 2007	December 15, 2007
Ash and his friends come to Zoey's aid as she has injured her right ankle. She tells them that the upcoming Contest requires the Pokémon Coordinator to use two Pokémon at once. Dawn, having no experience of double battles, ends up getting a crash course with comedic results.
510	506	42	"The Electrike Company!" (Rakurai Practice Center!!); Transliteration: "Rakurai Kunren Sentā!!" (Japanese: ラクライ訓練センター！！)	August 9, 2007	December 22, 2007
Ash and his friends meet Jocko, who is trying to discipline his Electrike, who has trouble with its accuracy. Brock asks if he could try and train it. Also, inspired by Electrike's dedication towards improvement, Team Rocket's James and Meowth decide to help out, but Jessie is not wanting any of that and is still wanting to capture Electrike.
511	507	43	"Malice in Wonderland!" (Mumage! Escape from the Nightmare!!); Transliteration: "Mūmāji! Akumu kara no Dasshutsu!!" (Japanese: ムウマージ！悪夢からの脱出！！)	August 16, 2007	December 29, 2007
Ash and his friends (along with Team Rocket) get lost and decide to take shelter from the rain under an old gate. After seeing a strange light, everyone has their inner desires fulfilled. However, things slowly but surely get more and more strange with each passing second.
512	508	44	"Mass Hip-Po-Sis!" (Save the Stray Hipopotas!); Transliteration: "Maigo no Hipopotasu o Tasukero!" (Japanese: 迷子のヒポポタスを助けろ！)	August 23, 2007	January 5, 2008
Ash and friends encounter a stray Hippopotas and return it to its migrating herd, but Team Rocket wants to capture Hippopotas.
513	509	45	"Ill-Will Hunting!" (Hunter J Returns! Protect Tatetops!!); Transliteration: "Hantā Jē Futatabi! Tatetopusu o Mamore!!" (Japanese: ハンターJ再び！タテトプスを守れ！！)	August 30, 2007	January 12, 2008
Pokémon Hunter J returns, now targeting a group of Shieldon. Can Ash and his friends, along with Ash's former rival Gary, help protect the Shieldon from the Hunter's evil grasp?
514	510	46	"A Maze-ing Race!" (Shuffle in the Maze! Everyone Hustle!!); Transliteration: "Meiro de Shaffuru! Minna de Hassuru!!" (Japanese: 迷路でシャッフル！みんなでハッスル！！)	September 13, 2007	January 19, 2008
Dawn wants to get the new coin flip Pokétch app, but accidentally goes to the wrong Pokémon Center. After finding out the actual location to get the application, our heroes set out. However, Team Rocket has set up a maze, which would allow them to separate the gang and steal their Pokémon but the plan starts to fail as Golems and an Onix stir up trouble.
515	511	47	"Sandshrew's Locker!" (Miru, Casey and, Underwater!); Transliteration: "Miru to Kēshī to Mizu no Soko!" (Japanese: ミルとケーシィと水の底！)	September 27, 2007	January 26, 2008
Ash and his friends meet Mira, a mysterious young girl, and her Abra. She leads them on a wild underwater expedition to recover a Sandshrew she lost as a child but find troubles as a Gyarados repeatedly attacks them.
516	—	48	"Ash and Dawn! Head for a New Adventure!!"; Transliteration: "Satoshi to Hikari! Aratanaru Bōken ni Mukatte!!" (Japanese: サトシとヒカリ！新たなる冒険に向かって！！)	September 27, 2007	—
A clip show summarizing the important events of the first 47 Diamond and Pearl episodes, including Ash's victories over Roark and Gardenia and the introductions of new rivals Paul and Zoey. This episode never received an English dub.
517	512	49	"Dawn's Early Night!" (Pokémon Contest! Yosuga Tournament!!); Transliteration: "Pokemon Kontesto! Yosuga Taikai!!" (Japanese: ポケモンコンテスト！ヨスガ大会！！)	October 4, 2007	January 26, 2008
Ash and the others finally reach Hearthome City, only to find out that the gym is closed. Meanwhile, it's the day of the Hearthome City Contest, only to find herself up against all her rivals: Zoey, Team Rocket's Jessie, and the wandering minstrel Nando. However, the performance stage proves to be more difficult for Dawn and her Pokémon than she thinks...
518	513	50	"Tag! We're It...!" (Everyone Participate! Tag Battle!!); Transliteration: "Zen'in Sanka! Taggu Batoru!!" (Japanese: 全員参加！タッグバトル！！)	October 4, 2007	February 1, 2008
The entire group enters a tag-team battle tournament in Hearthome City. Brock is paired with a female bird tamer named Holly, Dawn is paired with a nerd-like trainer named Conway, and Ash ends up with his rival Paul.
519	514	51	"Glory Blaze!" (Hikozaru vs. Zangoose! Destined Battle!!); Transliteration: "Hikozaru Tai Zangūsu! Unmei no Batoru!!" (Japanese: ヒコザルVSザングース！運命のバトル！！)	October 18, 2007	February 1, 2008
The Hearthome City Pokémon Tag-Team battle tournament continues, as Paul forces Chimchar to fight well past its limit. However in the end, Paul has had enough and releases Chimchar in front of Ash.
520	515	52	"Smells Like Team Spirit!" (Tag Battle! Final!!); Transliteration: "Taggu Batoru! Fainaru!!" (Japanese: タッグバトル！ファイナル！！)	October 25, 2007	February 1, 2008
After Chimchar accepts Ash's invitation to join the team, Ash battles alongside Paul in the tournament semifinals against Brock and Holly. They quickly make it to the finals where they are matched against Dawn and Conway.

== Music ==
The first 3 episodes in Japan did not have the opening song, instead the instrumental songs from the Pokémon: Diamond and Pearl Japanese Anime Sound Collection serve as opening songs for 3 episodes during the original broadcast, and for 1 episode on DVD. The Japanese opening song is "Together" by Fumie Akiyoshi for 47 episodes during the original broadcast, and for 45 episodes on DVD. The ending songs are "By Your Side 〜Hikari's Theme〜" (君のそばで 〜ヒカリのテーマ〜, Kimi no Soba de 〜Hikari no Tēma〜) for 21 episodes during the original broadcast, and for 23 episodes on DVD, "By Your Side 〜Hikari's Theme〜 (PopUp. Version)" (君のそばで〜ヒカリのテーマ〜 PopUp. Version, Kimi no Soba de 〜Hikari no Tēma〜 PopUp. Version) for 27 episodes, "By Your Side 〜Hikari's Theme〜 (Winter. Version)" (君のそばで 〜ヒカリのテーマ〜 Winter. Version, Kimi no Soba de 〜Hikari no Tēma〜 Winter Version) for 1 episode by Grin, and the English opening song is "Diamond and Pearl" by "Breeze" Barczynski. Its instrumental version served as the end credit song.

== Home media releases ==
In the United States, the series was released on six volume DVDs (each containing 8-9 episodes per disc) by Viz Media in North America, released both individually and in a boxset.

Viz Media and Warner Home Video released Pokémon the Series: Diamond and Pearl – The Complete Season on DVD on August 20, 2019.
