= Park Se-jun =

South Korean video gamer (born 1996)

Sejun Park
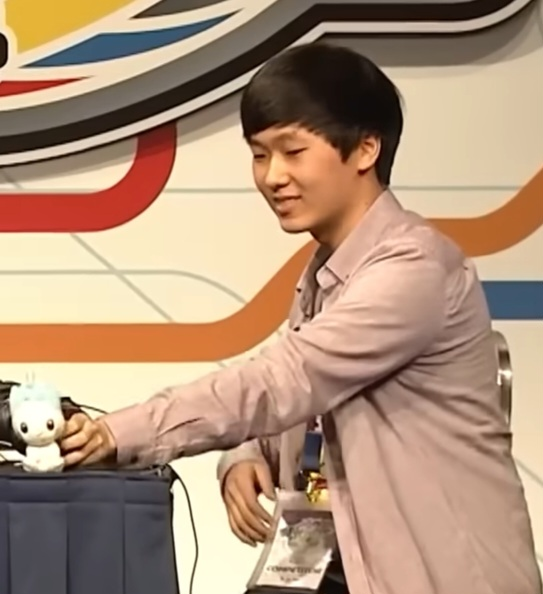
- Park at the 2014 World Championship

Personal information
- Name: 박세준 (Park Se-jun)
- Born: December 2, 1996 (age 29); South Korea
- Nationality: South Korean

Current team
- Team: T1
- Games: Pokémon; Pokémon Trading Card Game; Super Smash Bros. Ultimate
- League: Play! Pokémon

Career information
- Playing career: 2011–present

Team history
- 2019–2022: T1

Career highlights and awards
- World Champion (2014); 3× South Korean National Champion (2011, 2013, 2014)

Park Se-jun (Korean: 박세준), also referred to as Sejun Park, is a Pokémon video game and Pokémon Trading Card Game player. He is best known for winning the Masters Division of the Video Game Championships (VGC) at the 2014 Pokémon World Championships.

In November 2019, Park was picked up by esports team T1 as a player for the Pokémon Video Game, Pokémon Trading Card Game and Super Smash Bros. Ultimate. He announced on Twitter that he left the team in March 2022.

== Pokémon career ==
Park is highly regarded as one of the best players in the world and has consistently made Top 8 finishes as a video game player at the Pokémon World Championships. He made his debut on the international stage in 2011 by finishing 2nd in the Senior Division of the 2011 Pokémon World Championships losing to Kamran Jahadi (2011, 1st place), and as a fresh Masters Division player in 2012, finished 5th at the 2012 Pokémon World Championships after losing to Wolfe Glick (2012, 2nd place) in the quarterfinals.

In 2013, Park repeated history and placed 4th again at the 2013 Pokémon World Championships in Vancouver, losing to Ryosuke Kosuge (2013, 2nd place) in the quarterfinals.

In the following year, Park won the 2014 South Korea Video Game National Championships. He then proceeded to win the 2014 Pokémon World Championships in Washington, D.C., defeating Jeudy Azzarelli in the Master's Division finals. Park was notable for being the first South Korean to win the Pokémon World Championships and to win with a Pachirisu in his team, which was much adored by fans. In honor of his achievements, Pokémon Korea hosted a celebratory event known as 'Champion's Day' in November 2014.

In 2016, Park earned an invitation to the 2016 Pokémon World Championships as a Trading Card Game player (TCG).

In December 2019, Park won the Pokémon World Champion Invitational 2020, a grassroots tournament for Pokémon Sword and Shield in which all video game World Champions from past years were invited to. He executed a flawless run during the tournament, defeating Ray Rizzo (2010, 2011, 2012), Paul Ruiz (2018) and Naoto Mizobuchi (2019) in pools, and then Wolfe Glick (2016) and Shoma Honami (2015) in the semifinals and finals respectively.

He played in the 2022 Pokémon World Championships with Team Eternity, a South Korean Pokémon Unite team. Team Eternity finished the tournament in eighth place.

In 2023, Park attended the Pokémon GO South Korean Qualifiers and placed 18th and 11th in group stages, respectively. In the same year, Park returned to TCG and qualified for the 2023 Pokémon World Championships, ending his run in the group stage.

In 2024, Park placed top-8 at the Pokémon GO South Korean Qualifiers in the playoff stage. In the same year, he returned to his roots, qualifying for VGC at the 2024 Pokémon World Championships in Honolulu, his first Video Game Worlds in the Pokémon Scarlet and Violet era. His 2024 Worlds team also included Pachirisu, ten years after he won the World Championship with the Pokémon. However, he failed to advance to the second day, finishing with a 5-3 Swiss record.

In 2025, after achieving a record of 5-2 in the Swiss portion to qualify for playoffs, Park placed top-4 at the Pokémon GO South Korean Qualifiers, making him qualify for the 2025 Pokémon World Championships that year.

== Super Smash Bros. Ultimate ==
Sejun competed in Ultimate for several years, playing under just "Sejun" and playing King Dedede. His notable achievements include ranking in South Korea in 2019 and qualifying for the 2021 Smash World Tour's East Asia Ultimate Regional Finals, though he ultimately did not attend the latter due to travel restrictions from the COVID-19 pandemic.
