= Pachirisu =

Pokémon species

- Pokémon character
- Pachirisu in Pokémon Diamond and Pearl
- First game: Pokémon Diamond and Pearl (2006)
- Voiced by: Chinami Nishimura

In-universe information
- Species: Pokémon
- Type: Electric

Pachirisu (/pɑːtʃiˈriːsuː/; Japanese: パチリス) is a Pokémon species in Nintendo and Game Freak's Pokémon media franchise. First introduced in the video games Pokémon Diamond and Pearl, it has since appeared in multiple games, including Pokémon Go and the Pokémon Trading Card Game.

Classified as an Electric-type Pokémon, Pachirisu is a cyan-and-white squirrel with yellow sacs on its cheeks. It is considered the "Pikachu clone" of the fourth generation of Pokémon. Pachirisu was used by Se-Jun Park in the Pokémon World Championships in 2014, which resulted in widespread coverage, with many analyzing or praising the usage of Pachirisu in the tournament.

== Conception and development ==
Pachirisu is a species of fictional creatures called Pokémon created for the Pokémon media franchise. Developed by Game Freak and published by Nintendo, the Japanese franchise began in 1996 with the video games Pokémon Red and Green for the Game Boy, which were later released in North America as Pokémon Red and Blue in 1998. In these games and their sequels, the player assumes the role of a Trainer whose goal is to capture and use the creatures' special abilities to combat other Pokémon. Each Pokémon has one or two elemental types, which define its advantages and disadvantages when battling other Pokémon. A major goal in each game is to complete the Pokédex, a comprehensive Pokémon encyclopedia, by capturing, evolving, and trading with other Trainers to obtain individuals from all Pokémon species.

Pachirisu is an Electric-type Pokémon, featuring blue-and-white fur, a fluffy tail, and yellow cheeks. Pachirisu resembles a squirrel. It is considered the "Pikachu clone" (a traditionally Electric-typed Pokémon that resembles the design of series mascot Pikachu) of the fourth generation of Pokémon. Pachirisu's name comes from the Japanese words "pachipachi" and "risu", the first being the sound of an electric crackle and the second being the Japanese word for squirrel. Pachirisu has been voiced in the Pokémon anime series by Chinami Nishimura.

== Appearances ==
Pachirisu first appeared in the 2006 video games Pokémon Diamond and Pearl, where it could be captured in the wild by players. It also appeared the games' remakes, Pokémon Brilliant Diamond and Shining Pearl. It has since appeared in other mainline entries in the Pokémon series, including Pokémon Scarlet and Violet. It also appears in Pokémon Legends: Arceus. In addition to traditional Pokémon games, it also appears in other Pokémon games, such as Pokémon Go (where it is only found in Canada, Alaska, Greenland, Kazakhstan and Russia) and the Pokémon Trading Card Game. It appeared in the Pokémon anime under the ownership of major character Dawn.

== Critical reception ==
A screenshot of the Pokémon World Championships stream, where Pachirisu is using Follow Me. Pachirisu's unique role and contrast with standard Pokémon used in competitive play was met with praise.

Identified as one of the cutest Pokémon in the series and a popular mascot, Pachirisu came into prominence due to its an unexpected usage at the Pokémon World Championships in 2014, due in part to it traditionally being seen as a weak battling Pokémon in competitive Pokémon communities. Pachirisu was essential to the victory of the tournament's winner, Park Se-jun, who built Pachirisu around being able to take a lot of attacks from its opponents, as well as to be able to redirect powerful attacks towards it. When asked in an interview why he chose Pachirisu, Park stated that he knew people were expecting another Pokémon to fill Pachirisu's role, and wanted to use a Pokémon for the role that people would not expect. He later elaborated that he chose Pachirisu to serve as a support to his Gyarados, as Pachirisu's unique traits partnered well with Gyarados. Pachirisu's moveset also helped it deal with Pokémon that would normally stop it from performing well. Park expressed his enjoyment of Pachirisu, and the surprise he experienced over how excited people were for Pachirisu in the tournament. The success of Pachirisu in the competition lead to the audience chanting its name and cheering when Park sent it out. Patricia Hernandez of Kotaku appreciated Pachirisu's use, feeling like it made the competition more entertaining while still showing a strategic value. Park has since become known as Pachirisu-san among the fanbase due to his usage of Pachirisu in the tournament.

MeriStation staff discussed the legacy of Pachirisu's performance, describing how Park's Pachrisu symbolized his idealism for people to use their favorite creatures to win battles. They also described how Pachirisu has become less effective competitively in later entries in the series, due to a combination of changes to game mechanics and certain Pokémon being able to do what Pachirisu does more effectively. Pokémon designer Junichi Masuda described how surprising Pachirisu's success was for everyone, calling it "awesome." In the 2015 Italian Pokemon Video Game Championships, a Pachirisu based on Park's Pachirisu was distributed to attendees. A similar event was held in Korea. In 2022, The Pokémon Company did a promotional video in that year's Pokémon World Championships, featuring Pachirisu fighting Garchomp, Tyranitar, and Salamence, which was well-received by both audience members and Nintendo World Report writer Willem Hilhorst. A video by The Pokémon Company in 2024 hailed Park's usage of Pachirisu as being "arguably the most iconic moment in competitive history." Park later used a Pachirisu in the 2024 Pokémon World Championships, which took place ten years after Park's original win with Pachirisu. Spectators became excited, audibly cheering when Pachirisu was sent out, though Park did not end up winning enough games to qualify for the second day of the competition.

Pachirisu's popularity has been influenced by its use in the 2014 competition, resulting in a strong following by fans of the series, with large amounts of fanworks, such as fan art, subsequently following. Kotaku writer Kenneth Shepard regarded it as an iconic Pikachu clone, and the only one of them to have a significant impact, due to its role in official Pokémon competitions. Polygon writers Kevin Slackie and Moises Taveras ranked Pachirisu among the top 150 best Pokemon for similar reasons, feeling that Pachirisu showed that any Pokémon could be good in the right hands. IGN writer Dale Bashir expressed disappointment that Pachirisu did not appear in Pokémon Sword and Shield, particularly due to its success in the 2014 tournament, comparing it positively to two other squirrel Pokémon in the games, Skwovet and Greedent. The success of Pachirisu in the 2014 tournament inspired player Giovanni Costa to try and use Eevee, another Pokémon seen as weak in competitive formats, just like what Park did for Pachirisu, with Costa thinking it was "cool" that Park turned Pachirisu into a good Pokémon. The creator of the blog Hamsmogon commented on how the use of Pokémon like Pachirisu and Rotom helped demonstrate the diversity of competitive Pokémon, while competitive player Carfer praised it for being a symbol of "creativity and innovation" in competitive video gaming. VG247 writer Kat Bailey was also inspired by Park's performance with Pachirisu to change up how she approached competitive Pokémon, particularly in Double Battles, the format used in the Championships Park later performed a challenge run of Brilliant Diamond and Shining Pearl where he only used Pachirisu, each one designed with a specific niche. Inside Games writer Sushi felt that it was poetic that Pachirisu faced off against Garchomp at the end of this challenge, mirroring the 2014 competition.
