= Pokémon video game series competitive play =

Multiplayer battles using the Pokémon video games

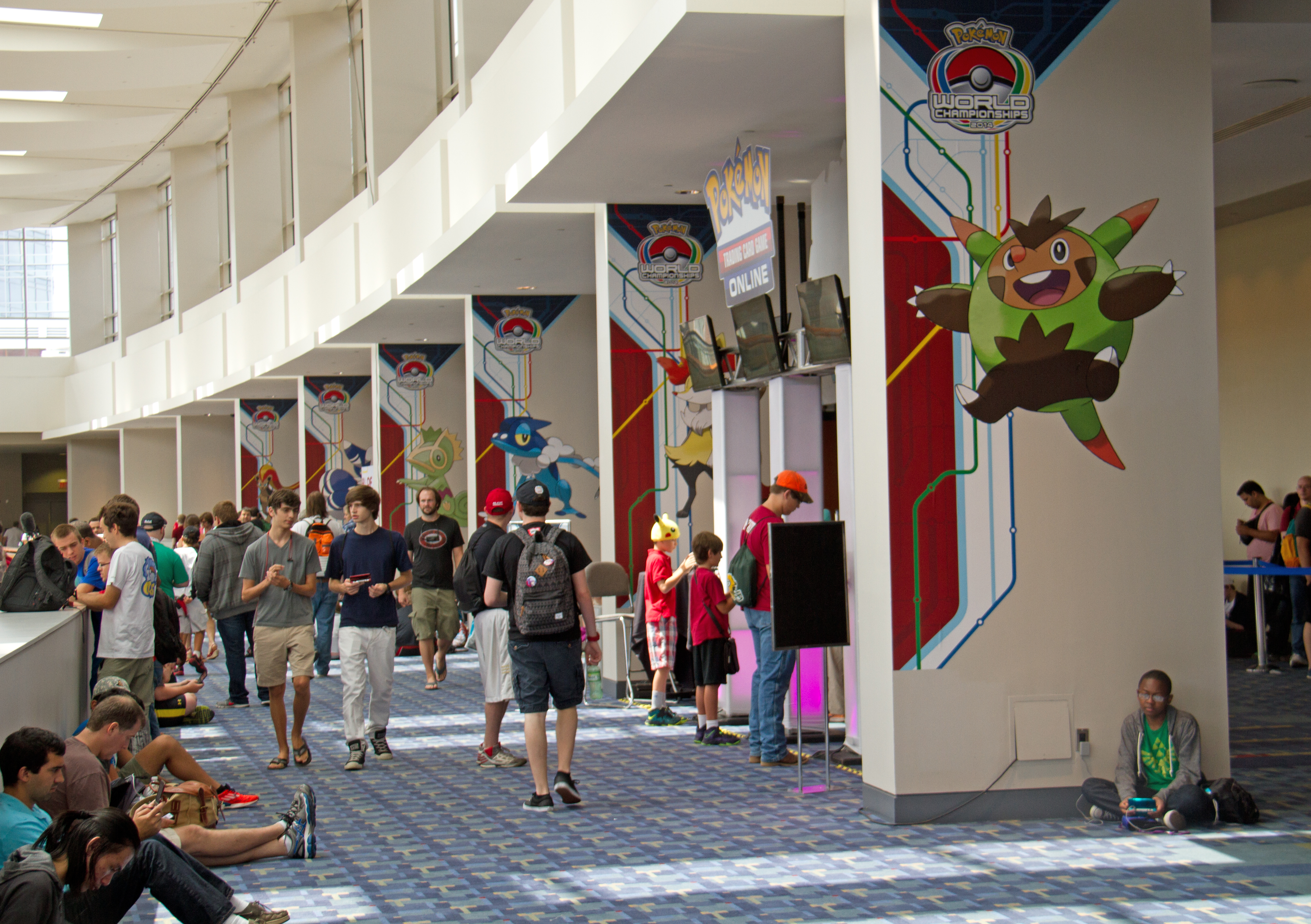
The 2014 Pokémon World Championships in Washington, D.C.

Competitive play in Pokémon generally involves player versus player battles that take place using the Pokémon video games. Using fictional species called Pokémon in battle, players aim to defeat all of the opponent's Pokémon in order to win. These battles are often fought for both official tournaments and for friendly and unofficial competition.

Competitive play has been a factor in the fan community of the Pokémon series since its inception, with early fan-made internet programs used to simulate battles due to the lack of official online support. Online fan-made competitive communities began to form around this time, but the scene grew substantially in popularity following the release of Pokémon Diamond and Pearl, which introduced online battling to the series. In response, The Pokémon Company established official competitive formats, which have since been hosted bi-yearly, with exceptions in 2020 and 2021 due to the COVID-19 pandemic. Since the introduction of official events, the competitive scene has expanded significantly, and the games have incorporated quality-of-life features to better support competitive play.

The competitive scene has generally been considered an open and welcoming environment for fans, particularly via in-person competitive events. The scene has been criticized for several barriers to entry, however, such as the time and monetary investment needed to play the series professionally. Other aspects, such as how competitive Pokémon should be played and the usage of hacked or generated Pokémon in the scene, have also received significant debate.

== Gameplay and metagame history ==
=== Series gameplay ===
Chart of the strengths and weaknesses of the eighteen Pokémon types

The mainline Pokémon video games are turn-based RPGs. In the series, players can battle against each other using teams of fictional creatures called Pokémon. Players take turns using their Pokémon until one team has all of their Pokémon knocked out. Players can use Pokémon's "moves" against an opposing Pokémon, with these moves having many effects, such as doing damage or inflicting status conditions. Pokémon also have "abilities", which grant their holders certain powers in battle, such as immunity against certain types of moves or strengthening a certain type of move. Pokémon types also greatly impact battling, as different types have different strengths or weaknesses against other types, which affects the amount of damage dealt to a given Pokémon.

Pokémon have six different stats, which affect different aspects of gameplay: HP, Attack, Defense, Special Attack, Special Defense, and Speed. These stats are further affected by "individual values" (IVs), which differ per each individual and determine how much growth is given to a particular stat. These stats can be further augmented by "effort values" (EVs) which can be used to provide further boosts in a given stat. Pokémon also have "natures", which boost one of a Pokémon's stats, but lower another in exchange. Pokémon can hold items, which give various benefits to a Pokémon in battle. Pokémon can also swap in and out of battle, though this will take a turn of combat, and the incoming Pokémon switching in will take whatever attack was targeted at the Pokémon being switched out.

Most aspects of the Pokémon games utilize single battles, which have one Pokémon on the field at a time per trainer and use teams of six. Official tournaments, however, use the double battle format, which has two Pokémon on the field at a time per trainer and bring four Pokémon out of a team of six.

=== Metagame history ===
In contrast to standard series gameplay, competitive Pokémon play focuses on player-versus-player battles separate from the story or progression of the game; players use teams of Pokémon specifically trained for the purposes of competitive battles. Incentives for competitive play range from friendly games for fun to official tournaments and competitions. Competitive play is divided between fan-made communities, which tend to prefer single battles, and official tournament communities, which tend to prefer double battles. Pokémon battles are turn-based but simultaneous, taking place in real time, which sets it apart from other competitive games. This has allowed for the series to develop unique strategies not found in other turn-based games.

Many team compositions in competitive Pokémon revolve around different strategies. These can range from teams built on dealing damage to teams built on withstanding more hits. Other strategies involve utilizing weather effects, which can be activated by different moves and abilities. Weather can affect the moves and abilities of a Pokémon, which can make certain species stronger or weaker. Entry hazards can be used to damage Pokémon when they switch onto the field, while the move Trick Room can be used to reverse the speed stats of Pokémon on the field, allowing slower Pokémon to move first. Other strategies include Tailwind, a move that can increase the speed of the entire team, and the usage of different types of "terrain", which have different passive effects when activated.

==== Synopsis of changes over time ====
In the first generation of the games, primarily Pokémon Red, Blue, and Yellow, battling was substantially different from later games in the series. Pokémon's Special Attack and Special Defense stats acted as one stat known as "Special", which led to several Pokémon having very strong Special stats. Additionally, IVs and EVs did not exist. Many of the more intrinsic systems of battling were not well-known in this generation. Strategies tended to focus on the spreading of status, such as Paralysis, which could cripple opposing teams. Another strategy involved the usage of the move "Hyper Beam", a powerful attack that normally required a turn to recharge, but did not need one if it KO'd the opposing Pokémon. Normal-type Pokémon were powerful as a result of their ability to deal additional damage with Hyper Beam; Psychic-type Pokémon were also powerful in combat. Other differences from later gameplay included a Pokémon's chance of scoring a critical hit being based on its speed stat and certain moves allowing a Pokémon to trap the opposing Pokémon and render them unable to act.

The second generation, beginning with the games Pokémon Gold and Silver, introduced two new types: Dark and Steel. These two types acted as counters to Psychic types due to their resistances to it, and the Dark type's super-effectiveness against it. Pokémon Ruby and Sapphire introduced abilities to the series, while Pokémon Diamond and Pearl introduced the physical-special split. Prior to these games, moves either used a Pokémon's Attack or Special Attack stat for damage calculation depending on the move's type. The physical-special split allowed for moves of the same type to be either physical or special, allowing for greater diversity in a Pokémon's pool of viable attacking options.

Pokémon X and Y rebalanced many older moves, leading to a more defensively focused metagame. The Dragon type, which had been powerful in previous metagames, was nerfed with the introduction of a new Fairy type, which takes no damage from Dragon-type attacks. Steel types, which had previously served as the sole resistance to Dragon-types, were additionally nerfed defensively, with Ghost and Dark-types now being able to hit them for neutral damage. Many other changes were introduced, such as Electric-type Pokémon becoming immune to Paralysis, and the effects of abilities which set weather conditions only setting the weather temporarily, as opposed to permanently. X and Y also introduced Mega Evolutions, powerful forms of older Pokémon. While it revamped older Pokémon, it has been stated to have been centralized around a few of the stronger Mega Evolutions in competitive, rather than all of them receiving equal use. In an interview, competitive player and caster Aaron Zheng stated that he saw the changes introduced in these games as helping to showcase that The Pokémon Company was interested in making gameplay changes for the competitive scene. The metagame of X and Y received criticism from some players for being too similar to past entries in the series, though VG247 writer Kat Bailey saw it as being an attempt at curbing powercreep in the series while also improving on pre-existing mechanics and species.

Pokémon Sun and Moon introduced further changes, such as the introduction of the "Z-Move" mechanic, which allows Pokémon to use powerful, one-time use moves that can either increase a Pokémon's stats or unleash a powerful attack. The unpredictability of when these moves would be used led to them being disliked by players for their role in the competitive metagame. Pokémon Ultra Sun and Ultra Moon introduced several changes to the metagame, such as an expansion to the number of moves Pokémon were capable of learning, the introduction of several new "Ultra Beast" Pokémon, and a change to the move "Wide Guard" that allowed Z-Move damage to be lowered for both sides of the field in double battles.

Pokémon Sword and Shield removed both Mega Evolutions and Z-Moves. Instead, it added a new feature named "Dynamax", which allows Pokémon to grow significantly larger for three turns and use "Max Moves", powerful moves with strong secondary effects. The in-game "battle timer", which measures the amount of time players have to battle against each other, was also decreased to twenty minutes, which led to some criticism from professional players in the community. Many species of Pokémon that were present in past games were removed in Sword and Shield, a decision colloquially termed "Dexit"; though widely criticised among the broader Pokémon fanbase, this move was well-received by competitive players. Pokémon Scarlet and Violet removed Dynamax, instead adding a new feature called "Terastallization", which allows a Pokémon to change its type during battle.

== History and community ==
Competitive Pokémon first started in the early years of the franchise, with events as early as 1999 being held in order to encourage battles between players. Though players swapped strategies on message boards or used websites for information, very few consistent sources were available at the time of the series' competitive beginnings. Early battle systems such as Porygon's Big Show were used in order to simulate battles without the need for official hardware. Other fans of the series created their own bots in order to simulate battles. A battle simulator was created in 2004 named NetBattle, which was able to simulate battles with graphics, unlike prior simulators which were entirely text based. Competitive community Smogon was founded soon afterward, which helped coordinate and unite various disparate competitive groups under one banner. Diamond and Pearl's release in 2006 kickstarted competitive Pokémon's more mainstream popularity due to introduction of online play.

Many changes have been introduced to allow for the training of Pokémon for competitive play to be easier. The breeding system, which had previously been used by players to more easily obtain competitive-level Pokémon, was expanded with further options. Several new items were introduced to make training easier as well. X and Y introduced super training, which allowed for easier access to EV training for players. The Pokémon Global Link was also introduced, which lists popular Pokémon used in the game's online battles, as well as popular held items, abilities, and battle partners, acting as a useful guide for players. Global Link was discontinued in Pokémon Sword and Shield. Those games also introduced nature mints, which allowed Pokémon to change their natures, and allowed users to rent teams made by others online. Though Sun and Moon previously featured similar game modes, a proper ranked gameplay mode was introduced in Sword and Shield.

Pokémon Showdown, a battling simulator, was released in October 2011, and has proved to be a popular tool among competitive players in the years following its release, averaging over a million visitors each month. It utilizes the tiering systems used by Smogon, which divides Pokémon into usage-based tiers, and is most frequently used for competitive play by members of the Smogon community. Smogon often bans Pokémon or strategies deemed too powerful for competitive usage, often decided via "Suspect Tests", which need a 60% majority to come to a conclusion. These changes are only used within the Smogon community and are not used at official events. As the metagame has developed, many additional tools and websites have been used in order to aid players with the construction of competitive teams.

Fans have made their own attempts to expand on the competitive scene. One creation was draft leagues, based on the NFL draft. Created by Steve "Magnitude" Wood, draft leagues quickly grew popular and developed their own fanbase within the community. Other fans have held their own fan-made tournaments as a result of extraneous circumstances. Following the cancellation of the World Championships due to COVID-19, many players held their own tournaments instead of the official ones. Several Nintendo Switch Pokémon games were announced to not have competitive scenes, resulting in players of the games hosting fan-made tournaments or creating in-game workarounds to create a scene to play in.

=== Official competitive formats ===
The Pokémon Company had previously held scattered competitions for the main series video games from 2005 onwards. Another competition, the Pokémon World Championships, was officially started by the company and began in 2004 as a competition for the Pokémon Trading Card Game and later expanded to the video game series in 2009. Players in a given country compete in competitions to obtain enough points, and obtaining enough points gains a player an invite to the Championships. The Championships are a three day long tournament, with players going through sets of Swiss rounds. Those who have the highest ranking move onto the next day of the competition. Once eight players remain, they compete until the final two, where the winner is decided in the finals. Players must register a "battle team" of Pokémon at the beginning of each event, which cannot be changed or altered throughout the event. All competitions have been held in the United States, with the exception of the 2013 Championships, being held in Vancouver, British Columbia, the 2022 Championships, which were held in London, the 2023 Championships held in Yokohama, and the upcoming 2027 Championships, which will be hosted in Singapore.

The World Championships are divided into three age divisions: Masters, Seniors, and Juniors, which is dictated by the participants' age. Though older players receive cash prizes, younger players receive scholarships. Unlike other competitive games, where there are typically a top set of players unlikely to be dethroned, the World Championships have a fluctuating top group of players that are less likely to be consistently dominant due to factors such as random chance elements in the battling format. Tournaments are overseen by "Pokémon Professors", who are community volunteers that ensure play is fair and competitive. Professors who oversee enough tournaments in a year can qualify to attend the World Championships that year and continue their role there.

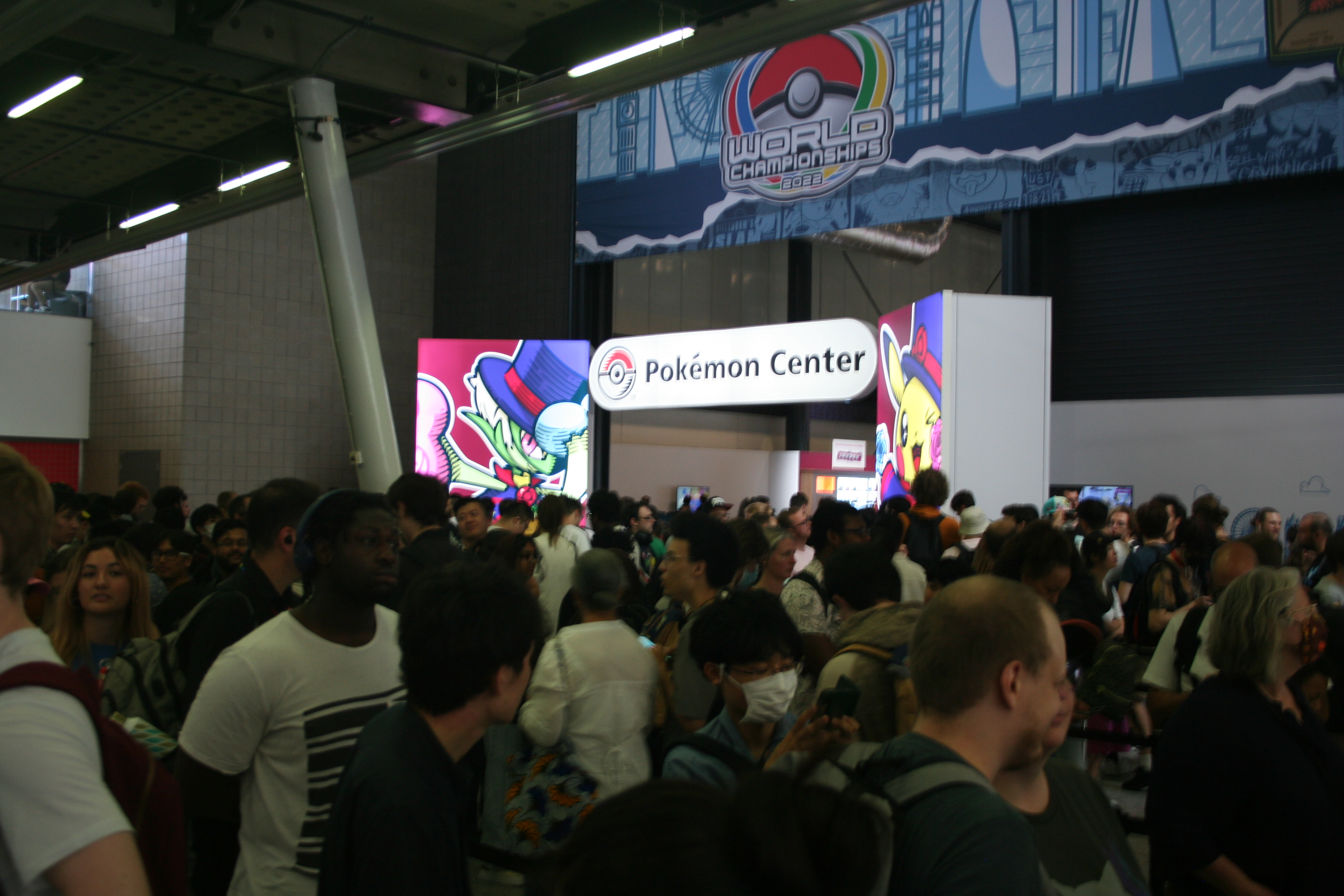
Entrance of the 2022 World Championships in London

Official Pokémon competitive formats, starting in 2015, added "premiere challenges" (Also known as PCs) on top of the previous selection of competitions. PCs are smaller and offer less points needed to qualify for Worlds. In 2016, Midseason Showdowns were introduced, which were smaller than Regionals but offered more points than PCs. In 2017, limits on the number of points, known as "best finish limits" (Or BFLs) were also introduced to limit the number of points obtainable from these smaller events. The number of points needed to qualify for Worlds was also increased, with points rewarded by events being scaled back.

Due to the COVID-19 pandemic, competitive play was suspended. The 2020 and 2021 World Championships, as well as their associated competitions, did not take place and were both cancelled, though those invited to the Championships retained their invites. New online gameplay formats, such as Pokémon Players Cup, the Play! Pokémon Team Challenge, and League at Home, were introduced in their stead. The Championships were later brought back in 2022. The 2024 Championships announced a change in ruleset, removing invites for a second day of competition, meaning those who make it as finalists regionally and internationally are automatically qualified for the World Championships. The number of points required to qualify was also increased.

The World Championships have been described by VentureBeat writer Jeremy Signor as being a strong community location, with fans of the series unified with a love for the series across several different Pokémon media. Kat Bailey, writing for USGamer, stated that the event helped rekindle her love for the series, highlighting its community aspects and the ingenuity of the players involved in the tournament. The introduction of the Championships have been cited by several outlets as legitimizing the competitive community, and have influenced how the series has treated elements designed to make competitive play easier.

=== Generating and hacking Pokémon ===
To create teams for competitive, players have to spend large amounts of time raising Pokémon teams to competitive standards, often requiring multiple games and dozens of hours of time. As Pokémon with optimal stat spreads and statlines are difficult to obtain, often taking hours at a time, Pokémon that are generated by external software with many competitive traits already present have become popular in the scene. Pokémon generated by software such as PKHeX are often the most popular manners of obtaining pre-generated Pokémon. PKHeX's generation methods tend to be ignored by official hack checks. It has led to a split in the competitive community, with some feeling that disqualification of players for bringing generated Pokémon is unfair to those who are skilled at the game but lack the time or ability to create teams demanded by competitive formats, while others feel The Pokémon Company has not cracked down on generated Pokémon enough.

TheGamer's Eric Switzer believed that the barrier of entry to players for the video game series was unfair, citing that other competitively played Pokémon games, such as the Trading Card Game and UNITE, did not require players to sink as much time into obtaining what was needed for competitive play. He believed that the time sink restricted players from being able to participate, though he also felt as though players using third-party software to generate their teams felt unfair to those who did spend the time preparing their teams. Ali Jones, writing for GamesRadar+, stated that the process of generating Pokémon was something that was unlikely to go away due to how much it streamlined the ability to get competitive-ready Pokémon. According to competitive player Brady Smith, 80-90% of competitive players generate their Pokémon through external software. The creator of the PKHeX software, Kaphotics, stated that 50% of all teams that were submitted online as rentals during the 2023 Pokémon World Championships had at least one hacked Pokémon on their team, while 17% of all teams that participated in the Championships themselves had hacked Pokémon on them, including that year's winner. He stated that despite there being more rental teams released during the period of the Championships than ever before, the ratio between teams with and without hacked Pokémon are the same as compared to previous installments.

Probably due to the additional scrutiny for legitimacy checks involving transfer between storage app Pokémon Home, as well as issues caused by Pokémon generated in the then-latest title Pokémon Legends: Arceus (which lacks a competitive scene), in order to crack down hacked Pokémon much more efficiently, the 2023 Pokémon World Championships saw numerous contestants being disqualified for the use of hacked Pokémon, and thus caused issues unforeseen by those who attempted to use Pokémon generated in those games.

== Reception ==
Laura Dale, writing for Destructoid, stated that, when compared to other competitive video game scenes, the competitive Pokémon community fostered a more opening and welcoming environment for all age groups, which she believed was due to the nature of the gameplay making all players start at an equal skill level. She also believed this was due to both official events, competitive players, and the games themselves emphasizing that losses were only a step forward, creating a more positive environment as a whole. Several professional players have stated that the game is interesting due to its simplicity and ease of getting into it, with the mind games involved in competitive matches making competitive play interesting while simultaneously entertaining for audiences. Justin Groot, writing for The Meta, stated that the competitive community, despite being fractured among several disparate groups who had their own preferred playstyles and wishes for how competitive Pokémon should be handled, was a largely united community as a result of a shared love of the series.

Justin Berube, writing for Nintendo World Report, stated that despite the popularity of the Pokémon franchise, very few partake in the game's competitive scene due to the high barriers of entry. These include aspects such as the amount of knowledge of the game's mechanics, the constantly shifting metagame, and the amount of time and effort that are needed in order to even participate in the scene in the first place. Jason Krell, writing for Kill Screen, criticized the amount of travelling and money that needed to be spent on competitive Pokémon to qualify its largest events, which players in the community had denounced as being a "pay-to-win" style of play. Ben Sledge, writing for TheGamer, criticized the game's high barriers of entry and low cash prizes for players, believing it made the game a less popular esport as a result.

Due to the different playstyles between different competitive groups, there have been divides in how different elements of the competitive scene should be handled. The initial announcement of that official competitions would use double battles in 2009 led to a split in the competitive community between those who enjoyed a given battling format. The Dynamax mechanic received mixed commentary from various competitive players, with double battle players praising the mechanic while single battle players disliked it.
