= Pokémon Showdown =

Pokémon battle simulator

- The teambuilder in Pokémon Showdown
- Original author: Guangcong "Zarel" Luo
- Developers: Multiple contributors including "Zarel" and Chris "chaos" Monsanto
- Release: October 2011; 15 years ago
- Written in: node.js, JavaScript
- Operating system: Web browser, Windows (discontinued)
- Available in: English, German, Spanish, French, Italian, Dutch, Portuguese, Turkish, Hindi, Japanese, Simplified Chinese, Traditional Chinese
- Type: Simulator
- License: Open source
- Website: pokemonshowdown.com

Pokémon Showdown is a fan-made simulator created by Guangcong "Zarel" Luo, for the purpose of competitive Pokémon battling using customisable teams of Pokémon. The site was adopted by Smogon University, a fan run community website and internet forum, in 2012, and became the official simulator used by the website and its forums. All Smogon tiers are available with individual competitive ladders on Showdown, with each tier split based on how often a certain species of Pokémon is used. Showdown is hosted as a web application and formerly as a Windows application.

Reception has been generally positive from gaming outlets and fans, though there have been concerns expressed regarding copyright infringement of the Pokémon franchise. The site has also been included in many academic studies focusing on artificial intelligence training.

== History ==
Early forms of Pokémon battle simulators included Netbattle and IRC, the former of which featured a functional user interface.

Development of Pokémon Showdown began in 2011 by Guangcong "Zarel" Luo. After playing an older simulator called Pokémon Online, Luo became bored of its basic user interface and decided to begin working on his own version. Showdown is written in JavaScript, allowing the deployment of changes in real-time, without the disadvantage of having to stop the servers to add new features. The primary goal for the simulator was to deliver a bug-free experience for the end user, whilst implementing all mechanics for all Pokémon generations up to that point in time.

Luo noticed that an older simulator's lack of a battle replay feature meant that players had to rely on a text log to show others those battles. Having already developed a concept for a replay feature, he went ahead with making this a feature on Showdown. In July 2012, Smogon adopted the website and battle simulator of Pokémon Showdown, after Luo attempted to garner interest on his battle replay player, originally conceptualised on the older simulator's forums, highlighted a need for a more customisable simulator. An internal quality control team approved and integrated sprites of Pokémon species from Pokémon Black and White (2010) onto the simulator with the assistance of a sprite artist. The server that hosts Showdown is funded by Smogon founder Chris "chaos" Monsanto. In 2017, both Showdown and later Smogon were the victims of a data breach, with passwords, including those belonging to administrators being compromised. Luo committed to implementing 2FA.

== Battle simulator ==
The primary feature of Pokémon Showdown is the ability to simulate Pokémon battles between players. Players can choose between different formats, such as those categorised by Smogon or others that are unique to Showdown.

=== Smogon tiers ===
See also: Pokémon video game series competitive play#Series gameplay

After playing Pokémon competitively for multiple years using IRC and Azure Heights channels, Smogon was set up by Chris "chaos" Monsanto on December 17, 2004. Smogon has a unique tiering system which splits individual species of Pokémon based on how frequently they are used. The tiers are split as follows:

- PU: Pokémon rarely used in NU. Species placed in this tier are considered to have "better options".
- NU (NeverUsed): Includes Pokémon that see minimal usage competitively in RU, including fully evolved Pokémon.
- RU (RarelyUsed): Includes Pokémon that are not commonly seen in UU due to drawbacks.
- UU (UnderUsed): Includes Pokémon that are unable to meet the usage requirements in OU.
- OU (OverUsed): The main tier, which includes serious competitive species. Species that are banned from this tier are allowed to be used in Ubers only.
- Ubers: A "banlist" competitive tier that includes Pokémon that are considered too powerful for OverUsed.

In Generation IX, a Pokémon requires a 4.52% usage rate to remain in tier, else they move to the direct tier below. A player must have at least a 50% chance of encountering said Pokémon in a typical day of battling (15-20 games) in order for it to continue to be part of the tier it is in. Tiers shift monthly.

== Other features ==
=== Random battles ===
An active random battle on Pokémon Showdown

Random battles is a metagame on Pokémon Showdown where each player is given six random fully evolved Pokémon. A specific difference to other tiers, including Smogon's own tiers, is the removal of "Team Preview", which allows players to see which species the opponent is using briefly before the battle begins.

=== Teambuilder ===
The teambuilder is a feature on Showdown that can be used to create teams to battle against other players. Pokémon can be selected alphabetically within an internal window, with specific restrictions dependent on the format that has been chosen. Items, abilities, moves, EVs (Note: Effort values) and IVs (Note: Individual values) are all selectable in the teambuilder, with illegal combinations, such as for Pokémon that have not yet been released officially, being blocked from use. Teams are stored using browser cookies and are able to be both imported and exported as a text file. The teambuilder also gives the ability to name created teams and organising teams with the use of file folders, with folders automatically generated for different tiers.

=== Ladder ===
Each format on Showdown has a ladder system. The system is ranked, and is centered around several indicators. Elo is a value that changes after the conclusion of a battle, increasing per win and decreasing per loss. This directly affects matchmaking. The second value, known as "Glicko-1" (and later Glicko-2), applies the Glicko rating system, changing at a slower interval, and also takes win to loss ratio into account. Glicko allows for a smarter representation of a specific players' skill level. A third value, known as Glicko X-Act Estimate, and named after its developer "X-Act", builds on Glicko, and functions based on the individuals probability of winning against an opponent. Twenty-four hours of no activity causes rank decay for players who have achieved a value of 1400 or over in a specific format.

=== Chat rooms ===
Showdown hosts multiple chat rooms where users are able to converse about different topics. For example, the Smogon tiers, with each having a respective chat room, and language rooms where users can speak French or German among others.

== Reception ==
=== General reception ===
The simulator has received mostly positive reception from online gaming outlets. Writing for Kotaku in 2019, Ben Sledge argued that Pokémon Showdown is "even better than using the official games to battle", noting ease of use and faster customisation. Sledge also compared the short length of time it takes to wait for a match on Showdown, compared to the much longer wait for online battles in the core series of Pokémon video games. Blake Johnson of Comic Book Resources noted the simulator's teambuilder in a 2022 review, remarking that it is "one of the biggest draws to Pokémon Showdown", highlighting the ease of use involved the teambuilder. Johnson concluded by saying that "almost every fan of the series can find something they'll enjoy within it".

Dimas Ibnu, comparing Showdown with Pokémon Champions for STG Play, explained that each catered to something different to the other. Showdown was described as being good for testing teams, whilst Champions has an "emotional connection", allowing players to use Pokémon caught from titles in the video game series. Ibnu expressed the progression of both in conjunction however, "test on Showdown, refine strategies, then bring those ideas into Champions for official battles." Kotaku writer Kenneth Shepard described Showdown as being "intimidating" compared to Champions, which "helped ease" him into competitive play with limited ability to integrate and not needing to conform to pre-established “metas”.

=== Copyright concerns ===
Despite receiving praise for its implementation of Pokémon customisation, ladder system and use in competitive battling, Pokémon Showdown has been the subject of concern regarding copyright infringement of the Pokémon franchise. Sports Illustrated reporter Cale Michael commented on this writing that "TPC (Note: The Pokémon Company) could have shut down Showdown at any time", but "has never made a move to do so that we know of", suggesting that because of the announcement of Pokémon Champions, the future of such a simulator "is less certain than ever before." Ben Sledge, writing for Kotaku in 2019, remarked that "Showdown uses trademarked names and copyrighted artwork, which could be an issue if Nintendo ever decides to come knocking." Creator Guangcong "Zarel" Luo opted not to make any comment on potential legal issues when questioned by Sledge. Reporting for TheGamer in 2025, Sledge again made a personal comment on Showdown's legal standing, saying, "it's always amazed me that Pokemon Showdown has lasted this long without a DMCA from the Pokemon Company, but the game persists." Justin Groot, writing for Kill Screen publication The Meta magazine, also labelled copyright infringement as a "major obstacle" in the way of "Smogon's brand of Pokémon competition becoming a full-fledged esport". Groot noted however that if popularity were to increase on the simulator, TPC could take measures similar to Nintendo and the Super Smash Bros. Brawl mod Project M.

=== Academic projects ===
A project named "Future Sight AI", developed by computer scientist Albert III in 2021, as reported by Jay Costello of The Verge, was able to progress up to the top five percent of players on the Pokémon Showdown ladder. It achieved this by extrapolating all possibilities for future turns in a given battle, and then using predictive learning to surmise how the turns will progress, finally settling on choices that offer the highest chance of winning. A similar project using a software agent that applies the Monte Carlo tree search algorithm, conducted in 2024 at the Massachusetts Institute of Technology was also able to achieve a ladder ranking, reaching 1693 elo on the fourth generation "Random Battle" format. Other projects involving artificial intelligence use on Pokémon Showdown have been conducted, including two by the Institute of Electrical and Electronics Engineers in both 2017 and 2019.

=== Showdown on Love Is Blind ===
In 2023, Love Is Blind contestant James Milton Johnson claimed on an episode of the show that he was a nationally ranked player on the simulator, and that he had previously been banned for the use of profanity. It was later proven by a Tweet posted by the official Showdown account, that whilst he did have ladder rankings, they were not ranked highly.
