= Wolfe Glick =

American esports player (born 1995)

Personal information
- Born: December 6, 1995 (age 30); Washington D.C., U.S.

Current team
- Team: M80
- Game: Pokémon
- League: Play! Pokémon

Career information
- Playing career: 2011–present

Team history
- 2018–2021: Panda Global
- 2022–2024: Beastcoast
- 2024–present: M80

Career highlights and awards
- World Champion (2016); 2 x International Champion (2019, 2025); 2 x US National Champion (2011, 2012); Players Cup II Champion (2020)

Twitch information
- Channel: WolfeyVGC
- Followers: 185.7 thousand

YouTube information
- Channel: WolfeyVGC
- Years active: 2016–present
- Subscribers: 2.36 million
- Views: 940 million
- Last updated: August 29, 2026

Wolfe Glick (/ˈwʊlf/ WUULF; born December 6, 1995), also known as Wolfey (/ˈwʊlf.i/ WUULF-ee) and known online as WolfeyVGC, is an American competitive Pokémon player, streamer, and YouTuber. He is the 2016 World Champion of the official Pokémon Video Game Championships (VGC) format, and has won 10 Regional, 2 National, and 2 International Championships. Additionally, he won the Players Cup II in 2020, and the Global Challenge in 2020 and in 2025 under the alias "33-4".

Wolfe Glick has been called one of the most popular VGC players of all time, and his unique strategies often strongly influence the metagame. His YouTube channel posts videos about competitive Pokémon content, including detailed overviews of his experiences at official VGC tournaments. In recognition of his VGC pursuits and impact on the competitive Pokémon community, Glick was inducted into the 'Games' category of the 2024 Forbes 30 Under 30.

== Education ==
Glick has a degree in economics, computational modeling, and data analytics from Virginia Tech. Before making competitive Pokémon his career, Glick worked as a government analyst and was an RA for his hall when attending university. Glick graduated from Thomas Jefferson High School for Science and Technology in Alexandria, VA.

== Competitive Pokémon ==
=== 2009–2021: Early career and first major event wins ===
Glick began participating in competitive Pokémon as a freshman in high school, when he participated in VGC Regional Tournament, winning it, and receiving a free flight to the National Tournament, which he also won. He made his debut in the World Championships in 2011, placing 6th overall. He won the Washington, D.C. Regionals and US Nationals in Indianapolis to qualify.

Following his 2nd placing at the 2012 World Championships, Glick's team was added to the Pokémon World Tournament facility in the Pokémon Black 2 and White 2 games. Accessible via an optional download, the "2012 Masters Division Challenge" allowed players to battle against an in-game trainer with his team.

2016 Pokémon World Championships: VG Masters Finals
- Official VOD

In 2016, while attending Virginia Tech, Glick won the Pokémon VGC World Championships, collecting around $10,000 in prize money. Glick played Jonathan Evans in the 2016 finals and beat him 2–0 in their best of 3 set, being crowned the World Champion.

Following his World Championship victory, he went on to win other major events, namely the 2019 North American International Championships (NAIC) and the 2020 Players Cup II. After this success, Glick became the first player to win a Regional, National, International, Players Cup and a World Championship. As a reward for winning the 2020 Players Cup II, one of Glick's Pokémon, a Coalossal, was distributed to Pokémon video game Sword and Shield players via a Mystery Gift in-game code that expired in August 16, 2021. The code was 'V1CT0RYENG1NE25'.

=== 2022–2026: Return to Pokémon VGC and continued success ===
Though the Pokémon VGC scene was paused during the COVID-19 pandemic, Glick returned to action when Play! Pokémon began hosting live events again in 2022. He came in with a top-32 finish at the Salt Lake City Regional Championships.

Glick started the 2023 season with a top-16 finish at the 2023 London Open, and placed top-16 across several more events during the year. He won his first official offline championship in over three years in the 2023 Orlando Regional Championship, at the time the biggest Pokemon VGC tournament ever. Glick qualified for the 2023 Pokémon World Championship, but was eliminated on day one with a 4-3 record.

==== 2024 VGC Season ====
In the 2024 Pokémon World Championships, Gliick had a strong run to start 9-0 in sets and 18-0 in games. After qualifying for the final round of 32 with a Swiss record of 9-2, he was eliminated by Kylan Van Severen, finishing at 17th place.

==== 2025 VGC Season ====
Glick won the 2025 Toronto Regional Championships, becoming the first player to have won 10 Regional Championships.

In February 2025, Glick won the Pokémon Europe International Championships (EUIC), beating Dylan Yeomans. This was the largest in-person Pokemon VGC tournament in history (boasting 1257 competitors in the masters division) and marked his second International Championship victory. In addition, Glick revealed that he had also secretly been the one to have won the 2025 Global Challenge I under the temporary name “33-4”, which has been confirmed by The Pokémon Company.

In the 2025 Pokemon North America International Championships, watchers of the official tournament stream could receive "Wolfe Glick’s Incineroar" as a "mystery gift", sporting the same stats and moves as the Incineroar that helped Glick win that year's EUIC. At the 2025 Pokemon World Championships, he made day two, but was eliminated at 42nd by Chih-Hung Chiu, finishing with a record of six wins and three losses.

==== 2026 VGC Season ====
Wolfe began his 2026 Season with a top-16 finish in the North American bracket of the 2026 Grand Challenge I. At the Milwaukee Regional Championships, he finished in 8th place, losing to the eventual winner of the tournament, Alex Arand. On October 23, 2025, Glick posted a video to his channel called "Moving Forward". In the video, Glick announced a four-month hiatus from attending in-person tournaments, citing groping from fans combined with a neck injury and overall stress. During his hiatus, Glick won the online 2026 Grand Challenge III in November 2025. He returned to in-person competition at the European International Championships in February 2026, placing 39th of a record 1,455 players. He then attended the first two North American tournaments played in Pokémon Champions, placing second at the Indianapolis Regional Championships and third at the North American International Championships before being eliminated on day 1 of Worlds with a record of 5 wins and 3 losses.

== Esports teams ==
In 2018, Glick joined the esports team Panda Global, departing in 2021. Glick joined the competitive Pokémon section of the esports team Beastcoast in September 2022. In December 2024, esports organization M80 acquired the esports and creator operations of Beastcoast.

== Personal life ==
Wolfe Glick is a vegetarian. In 2021, Glick said that he might have aphantasia. He resides in Washington, D.C.

== Tournament placings ==
=== Regional Championships ===
(Note: The Pokémon Regional Championships are the first level of major events, featuring larger attendance and Championship Point payout than in-store events.)

Tournament	Date	Age Division	Placing
DC Regionals 2011	June 11, 2011	Masters	1st
Philadelphia Regionals 2012	April 15, 2012	Masters	2nd
Virginia Regionals 2014	January 11-12, 2014	Masters	5th
Philadelphia Regionals 2015	October 4-5, 2014	Masters	2nd
Virginia Regionals 2015	February 15, 2015	Masters	8th
Florida Regionals 2015	March 1, 2015	Masters	1st
Massachusetts Regionals 2015	May 17, 2015	Masters	1st
Pennsylvania Regionals 2016	October 10-11, 2015	Masters	1st
Florida Regionals 2016	February 28, 2016	Masters	1st
Georgia Regionals 2016	May 21, 2016	Masters	3rd
Orlando Regionals 2017	October 15-16, 2016	Masters	3rd
Georgia Regionals 2017	January 14–15, 2017	Masters	5th
Charlotte Regionals 2018	March 17–18, 2018	Masters	1st
Madison Regionals 2019	June 1–2, 2019	Masters	3rd
Richmond Regionals 2020	November 2-3, 2019	Masters	4th
Collinsville Regionals 2020	February 29 - March 1, 2020	Masters	2nd
Secaucus Regionals 2022	May 21–22, 2022	Masters	3rd
Orlando Regionals 2023	February 4–5, 2023	Masters	1st
Knoxville Regionals 2023	February 25–26, 2023	Masters	5th
Charlotte Regionals 2023	March 25–26, 2023	Masters	9th
Fort Wayne Regionals 2023	April 1–2, 2023	Masters	9th
Hartford Regionals 2023	May 20–21, 2023	Masters	3rd
Pittsburgh Regionals 2024	September 9–10, 2023	Masters	2nd
Charlotte Regionals 2024	January 20–21, 2024	Masters	1st
Orlando Regionals 2024	April 13–14, 2024	Masters	1st
Baltimore Regionals 2025	September 14-15, 2024	Masters	9th
Louisville Regionals 2025	October 12-13, 2024	Masters	8th
Toronto Regionals 2025	December 14-15, 2024	Masters	1st
Milwaukee Regionals 2026	October 11-12, 2025	Masters	6th
Indianapolis Regionals 2026	May 30-31, 2026	Masters	2nd

=== National Championships ===
(Note: From 2017 onwards, the US Nationals have effectively been superseded by the North American International Championships.)

Tournament	Date	Age Division	Placing
US Nationals 2011	July 3–4, 2011	Masters	1st
US Nationals 2012	June 30 – July 1, 2012	Masters	1st
US Nationals 2013	July 5–7, 2013	Masters	Day 1
US Nationals 2014	July 4–6, 2014	Masters	Day 1
US Nationals 2015	July 3–5, 2015	Masters	8th
US Nationals 2016	July 1–3, 2016	Masters	Day 1

=== International Championships ===
(Note: The Pokémon International Championships are the top-level of competition in VGC Pokémon (apart from the annual Pokémon World Championship).)

Tournament	Date	Age Division	Placing
European Internationals 2017	December 9–11, 2016	Masters	11th
Oceania Internationals 2017	March 10–12, 2017	Masters	9th
European Internationals 2019	April 26-28, 2019	Masters	4th
North America Internationals 2019	June 21–23, 2019	Masters	1st
European Internationals 2022	April 22-24, 2022	Masters	9th
North America Internationals 2022	June 24–26, 2022	Masters	15th
North America Internationals 2023	June 30 - July 2, 2023	Masters	17th
European Internationals 2024	April 5–7, 2024	Masters	13th
North America Internationals 2024	June 7–9, 2024	Masters	22nd
European Internationals 2025	February 21-23, 2025	Masters	1st
European Internationals 2026	February 13-15, 2026	Masters	39th
North America Internationals 2026	June 12-14, 2026	Masters	3rd

=== World Championships ===
Tournament	Date	Age Division	Placing
Worlds 2011	August 15, 2011	Masters	6th
Worlds 2012	August 12, 2012	Masters	2nd
Worlds 2013	August 9–11, 2013	Masters	25th
Worlds 2014	August 15–17, 2014	Masters	9th
Worlds 2015	August 21–23, 2015	Masters	12th
Worlds 2016	August 19–21, 2016	Masters	1st
Worlds 2017	August 18–20, 2017	Masters	15th
Worlds 2018	August 24–26, 2018	Masters	Day 1
Worlds 2019	August 16–18, 2019	Masters	32nd
Worlds 2022	August 18–21, 2022	Masters	Day 1
Worlds 2023	August 11–13, 2023	Masters	Day 1
Worlds 2024	August 16-18, 2024	Masters	17th
Worlds 2025	August 15–17, 2025	Masters	42nd
Worlds 2026	August 28-30, 2026	Masters	59th

=== Online Events ===
Tournament	Date	Age Division	Placing
2020 Global Challenge	2020	Masters	1st
Players Cup II (Note: The Pokémon Players Cup events were a series of online-exclusive tournaments held in place of the regular competitive circuit, due to the cancellation of in-person events during the COVID-19 pandemic. There were four of these events in a span of two years.)	2020	Masters	1st
2023 Global Challenge I	2023	Masters	Top 64
2023 Global Challenge II	2023	Masters	6th
2024 Grand Challenge I	2024	Masters	Top 64
2025 Global Challenge I	2025	Masters	1st
2026 Grand Challenge I	2025	Masters	Top 64
2026 Grand Challenge III	2025	Masters	1st
2026 Grand Challenge V	2026	Masters	2nd
2026 Global Challenge I	2026	Masters	6th

== Records and achievements ==
- The first and only player to win a Regional, National, International, Players Cup, and World Championship.
- The first and only player ever to have won 10 Regional Championships.
- The record for the most World Championship participations (qualifying every year from 2011 to 2019, and 2022 to 2026).
- The record for the most "top cuts" (the final single-elimination bracket) at the World Championships.
