= Ray Rizzo =

American esports player

Raymond Rizzo
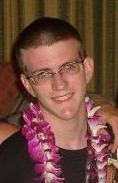
- Rizzo in 2010

Personal information
- Nickname: Ray
- Born: 1992 or 1993 (age 33–34)
- Nationality: American

Career information
- Game: Pokémon

Career highlights and awards
- World Champion (2010, 2011, 2012)

Raymond Rizzo is an American three-time Pokémon Video Game World Champion (2010, 2011, 2012). He has won the title three times, making him the only person to have done so.

His success can be partly attributed to his team building skills - one example of this is his use of a defensive, support-oriented Thundurus at a time when most players used Thundurus offensively, and this innovation subsequently dominated the Pokémon competitive scene for years after its first appearance at the 2011 World Championships.

== Personal life ==
Rizzo grew up in the Marlton section of Evesham Township, New Jersey in the United States, He began playing Pokémon as a child. He attended Drake University in Des Moines, Iowa, studying actuarial science. He passed three actuarial exams while at Drake. He resides in Tokyo, Japan.

== Pokémon career ==
In 2010, Rizzo won his first Pokémon World Championship in Hawaii after defeating Japan's Yasuki Tochigi in the Senior Division finals. He then won the 2011 World Championship in San Diego, California after defeating Matteo Gini in the then-new Masters Division finals. He next won the 2012 World Championship in Hawaii, defeating Wolfe Glick (who Rizzo regards highly) in the Masters Division finals, making Rizzo the first three-time Pokémon Video Game World Champion. To commemorate this, the Pokémon Company released a shiny Metagross with the same moves, ability and nature as Rizzo's.

Rizzo was defeated in the first round of elimination at the 2013 Pokémon World Championships. In 2014, Rizzo was alleged to have cheated by using a hacked Aegislash at the 2014 US Pokémon National Championships. He denied the accusations, but said that he would not be using the Pokémon in the future. The allegedly hacked Pokémon would have conferred no advantage in the competition, only saving time by avoiding on-cartridge grinding, but would still have been a violation of tournament rules.

In 2015, Rizzo was inducted into the Guinness World Records for his achievements. However, he did not qualify for the 2015 Pokémon World Championships.

Rizzo also has a YouTube channel where he discusses competitive Pokémon. As of March 31st 2026, he has 75.6k subscribers and 19.9 million channel views.
