= Pokémon Champions =

2026 video game

- Cover art
- Developer: The Pokémon Works
- Publishers: The Pokémon Company (Note: Nintendo Switch version in Japan, and mobile versions worldwide); Nintendo (Note: Nintendo Switch version worldwide)
- Directors: Masaaki Hoshino; Kazumasa Iwao
- Producer: Masaaki Hoshino
- Designer: Shigeki Morimoto
- Programmers: Sei Nakatani; Ryoma Tachimoto
- Artist: Tatsuya Makita
- Composers: Minako Adachi; Go Ichinose
- Series: Pokémon
- Engine: Unity
- Platforms: Nintendo Switch; Android; iOS
- Release: Nintendo Switch; April 8, 2026; Android, iOS; June 17, 2026
- Genre: Turn-based strategy
- Modes: Single-player, multiplayer

Pokémon Champions is a strategy video game developed by The Pokémon Works and published by Nintendo and The Pokémon Company for the Nintendo Switch, Android and iOS. It is a spin-off of the Pokémon video game series focused on multiplayer gameplay. It was announced on February 27, 2025, during a Pokémon Presents livestream, alongside the gameplay reveal of Pokémon Legends: Z-A. The game was released on Nintendo Switch on April 8, 2026, with ports to iOS and Android following on June 17.

== Gameplay ==
This is the first game from The Pokémon Works, a joint venture between The Pokémon Company and ILCA. As a turn-based strategy game, it is similar in gameplay to the Pokémon Stadium series of video games, and features compatibility with Pokémon Home, which allows it to connect with Pokémon Scarlet and Violet and other games on the Nintendo Switch, as well as cross-platform play between mobile platforms and Nintendo Switch. It supports Mega Evolution, and is expected to also feature other battle mechanics in future, including Terastallization. The game was used in place of the latest game in the mainline series at Video Game Championship (VGC) events organized by Play! Pokémon, including the Pokémon World Championships. This started with the Malaysia Master Ball League and the Indianapolis Regional Championships, held on May 9–10 and May 29–31, respectively.

While mainline Pokémon video games up until Pokémon Scarlet and Violet are turn-based role-playing games that are also used for competitive tournaments like the Pokémon World Championships, Pokémon Champions is a concerted effort to separate the competitive battling aspect. Pokémon Champions primarily offers an experience centered around battling. There are ranked battles, casual battles, and an online tournament. Players can participate in ranked battles, casual battles, and online tournaments using Pokémon either recruited in-game or transferred in from Pokémon Home.

The Recruit system in Champions works as a gacha system, with players spending Victory Points (VP) to pull a random selection of Pokémon. From that selection, players can choose one Pokémon to add to their personal roster, either temporarily or permanently. Adding a Pokémon temporarily is free, while adding a Pokémon permanently costs an additional 2,500 VP. Alternatively, an item called a Teammate Ticket can be used for permanent recruitment, instead. Once a day, players can pull a random selection of Pokémon for free, though permanent recruitment still must be paid for.

Players earn VP primarily by winning battles and completing quests. In addition to recruiting Pokémon, VP can also be used to buy battle items, cosmetics, and music, as well as to train recruited Pokémon.

Temporarily recruited Pokémon can only be battled with for a limited time, and cannot be trained. Once their time limit has run out, they remain available for permanent recruitment.

== Reception ==
Reception

Aggregate scores
Aggregator	Score
Metacritic	66/100
OpenCritic	45% recommended

Review scores
Publication	Score
Blunt Magazine	3/5
Game Informer	7/10
GameWith	8.5/10
IGN	6/10
Nintendo Life	5.1/10

Pokémon Champions received "mixed or average" reviews according to the review aggregator website Metacritic. On OpenCritic, 45% of critics recommended the game. Kallie Plagge of The Verge wrote that the game was "not newcomer-friendly" but also "frustrating for experienced players" and was "plagued with bugs". Lowell Bell of Nintendo Life called it "simultaneously the most accessible and flawed competitive Pokémon has ever been".

IGN writer Scott White criticized the game for the lack of content aside from online battling, calling the 186 available species, "paltry". Despite this, White described Champions as a "solid foundation". Writing for Game Informer, Charles Harte similarly noticed a lack of content, however was happy that "for a free-to-play game, infinitely playable multiplayer is plenty to satisfy". Harte also attributed simplicity to an easier experience for newcomers to the franchise, however warned of virtual currency (VP) acting as an obstacle. Japanese reviewer GameWith praised the low barrier to entry, and stressed that continuous regulation updates would "prevent stagnation" in the future, though expressed disappointment at the small number of species available at launch. They also highlighted the direct support with Pokémon HOME. Blunt Magazine's Ben Veress cited Champions as a continuation of previous battle-oriented titles such as Pokémon Battle Revolution and Pokémon Stadium, but with the differentiation of being free-to-play. Veress said that Champions does not "re-invent the wheel" however, and referred to the general concept of the title as a "solid blueprint".

Champions has been compared to the unofficial Pokémon battle simulator Pokémon Showdown. Dimas Ibnu, writing for STG Play, explained that each catered to something different to the other. Showdown was described as being good for testing teams, whilst Champions has an "emotional connection", allowing players to use Pokémon caught from titles in the video game series. Ibnu expressed the progression of both in conjunction however, "test on Showdown, refine strategies, then bring those ideas into Champions for official battles." Kotaku writer Kenneth Shepard described Showdown as being "intimidating" compared to Champions, which "helped ease" him into competitive play with limited ability to integrate and not needing to conform to pre-established “metas”.
