= Pokémon World Championships =

Trading card game and esports event

- Current season, competition or edition: 2026 Pokémon World Championships
- Game: Pokémon
- Founded: 2004
- Owner: The Pokémon Company
- CEO: Tsunekazu Ishihara
- Divisions: Junior (born up to 12 years before the year of the current tournament season, except for those under six years old); Senior (born 13 to 16 years before the year of the current tournament season); Masters (born 17 or more years before the year of the current tournament season)
- Headquarters: Bellevue, Washington, U.S.
- Venue: Varies
- Website: Play! Pokémon Events

The Pokémon World Championships is an invite-only trading card game and esports event organized by Play! Pokémon. It is held annually in August and features games from the Pokémon series, including the Pokémon Trading Card Game, Pokémon video games and Pokémon Go. Players earn invitations to the World Championships based on their performance in qualifiers and other tournaments held throughout the season and compete for scholarship money, prizes and the title of World Champion. With the exception of Asia, invitations to the World Championships are administered by the Play! Pokémon program.

== History ==
The Pokémon World Championships first began with the Pokémon Trading Card Game (TCG) in 2004, which was around the time that the franchise was regaining its popularity. In 2008, Play! Pokémon began to organize competitive tournaments for the Pokémon video game series alongside the TCG, which is collectively known as the Video Game Championships (VGC). Like the TCG Championships, players compete with other players in their own age divisions (i.e. Junior, Senior and Masters) in different Premier Tournaments, and the season culminates with the best players earning an invitation to play the Pokémon World Championships in August. The tournaments in VGC were played with a different game each year, mainly the latest Pokémon game from its main series, up until 2025. From 2026, all VGC tournaments will be played on Pokémon Champions.

In 2013, the Pokémon World Championships marked the first time the tournament would be held outside the usual United States. It took place inside Vancouver Convention Centre in Vancouver, British Columbia of Canada. The 2015 Championships marked the first tournament to feature a spin-off game in the current tournament rotation, with Pokkén Tournament being included in the list. In 2018, the upper Pokkén Tournament DX was used instead. 2019 added its second addition of a spin-off game series into rotation, Pokémon GO.

The 2020 tournament marked the second time the tournament was hosted outside United States, and the first outside the North America continent. It was announced to be held at Excel London in London, United Kingdom. This is likely due to the setting of Pokémon Sword and Shield, which takes place in a region inspired by the United Kingdom known as Galar, and it is the set of games that would be played by the video game division of the Pokémon World Championships.

The 2020 tournament was originally planned to be held in 2020, but on March 31 that year, in-light with the COVID-19 pandemic, the tournament was postponed with its 2020 seasons being suspended, which proceeds from earlier announcements in March which saw the cancellation of the 2020 European International Championships and part of its season between March and June 2020. The tournament was not held in 2021 following another postponement on February 9, 2021, and that tournament ultimately held on August 18-21, 2022.

Prior to the 2022 series, in early January 2022, Play! Pokémon announced the inclusion of a third spin-off game into the competition lineup, Pokémon Unite; four months later, it was announced the Pokkén Tournament would host its last season, thus rotating the latter game out of tournament lineup from 2023 onwards. It marked the newest MOBA game to have an official esports tournament, after League of Legends.

The 2023 Pokémon World Championships marked its third tournament to be held outside United States, the first time to be hosted in their franchise's country of origin, and the first in the Asian region, at the Pacifico Yokohama in Yokohama, Japan (the basis of Vermilion City in the Kanto region). After the PWC ended, The Pokémon Company announced that the Pokémon World Championships would return to Hawaii for the first time since the previous World Championships in the state was held back in 2012. Both the 2025 and 2026 events were held at the state of California, in Anaheim and San Francisco, respectively. The 2026 tournament marked the first time where two separate venues were used for the tournament, with one for the main event and another, Chase Center, would serve as the venue for the Championship Sunday.

At the conclusion of the 2026 event, it was announced that Singapore would host the 2027 event, marking the return of the tournament to Asia for the first time since the 2023 event in Yokohama and the first time Southeast Asia is given the hosting rights, and the fourth overall outside United States. The tournament rules and season lineup were published on September 8, and also announced that Pokémon Unite is rotated out from the tournament rotation. Latin American Spanish and Brazilian Portuguese languages for the commentary will also be added towards the current languages for the commentaries.

== List of World Championships ==
As of 2026, PWC hosted 21 annual tournaments since its first tournament in 2004, except those in 2020 and 2021. They are mostly held across 11 venues from seven different states of the United States. Only four iterations were held outside United States, those being Canada in 2013, United Kingdom in 2022, Japan in 2023, and Singapore in 2027.

Year	Date	Venue		Hosting location		Format			Ref.
Year	Date	Main event	Championship Sunday	City	Country	TCG series	Video Game	Spin-offs	Ref.
2004	August 20-22, 2004	Wyndham Palace Resort & Spa		Orlando, Florida	United States	e-Card Expedition Base Set-EX Hidden Legends	N/A (not held)	N/A (no games)	
2005	August 19-21, 2005	Town and Country Resort and Convention Center		San Diego, California	United States	EX Ruby & Sapphire-EX Emerald	N/A (not held)	N/A (no games)	
2006	August 18-20, 2006	Hilton Anaheim		Anaheim, California	United States	EX Hidden Legends-EX Holon Phantoms	N/A (not held)	N/A (no games)	
2007	August 10-12, 2007	Hilton Waikoloa Village		Waikoloa Village, Hawaii	United States	EX Deoxys-Diamond & Pearl	N/A (not held)	N/A (no games)	
2008	August 15-17, 2008	Hilton Orlando Lake Buena Vista		Orlando, Florida	United States	EX Holon Phantoms-DP Majestic Dawn	Pokémon Diamond and Pearl	N/A (no games)	
2009	August 13-15, 2009	Hilton San Diego Bayfront		San Diego, California	United States	Diamond & Pearl-HG Unleashed	Pokémon Platinum	N/A (no games)	
2010	August 13-15, 2010	Hilton Waikoloa Village		Waikoloa Village, Hawaii	United States	Diamond & Pearl-HG Unleashed	Pokémon HeartGold and SoulSilver	N/A (no games)	
2011	August 12-14, 2011	Hilton San Diego Bayfront		San Diego, California	United States	DP Majestic Dawn-Black & White	Pokémon Black and White	N/A (no games)	
2012	August 13-15, 2012	Hilton Waikoloa Village		Waikoloa Village, Hawaii	United States	HeartGold & SoulSilver-BW Dark Explorers	Pokémon Black and White	N/A (no games)	
2013	August 9-11, 2013	Vancouver Convention Centre		Vancouver, British Columbia	Canada	Black & White-BW Plasma Freeze	Pokémon Black 2 and White 2	N/A (no games)	
2014	August 15-17, 2014	Walter E. Washington Convention Center		Washington, D.C.	United States	BW Next Destinies-XY Flashfire	Pokémon X and Y	N/A (no games)	
2015	August 21-23, 2015	Hynes Convention Center		Boston, Massachusetts	United States	BW Boundaries Crossed-XY Roaring Skies	Pokémon Omega Ruby and Alpha Sapphire	Pokkén	
2016	August 19-21, 2016	San Francisco Marriott Marquis		San Francisco, California	United States	XY Kalos Starter Set-XY Steam Siege	Pokémon Omega Ruby and Alpha Sapphire	Pokkén	
2017	August 18-20, 2017	Anaheim Convention Center		Anaheim, California	United States	XY Primal Clash-SM Burning Shadows	Pokémon Sun and Moon	Pokkén	
2018	August 24-26, 2018	Music City Center		Nashville, Tennessee	United States	XY BREAKthrough-SM Celestial Storm	Pokémon Ultra Sun and Ultra Moon	Pokkén	
2019	August 16-19, 2019	Walter E. Washington Convention Center		Washington, D.C.	United States	Sun & Moon-SM Unbroken Bonds	Pokémon Ultra Sun and Ultra Moon	Pokkén, GO	
2020	Cancelled due to COVID-19 pandemic					SM Ultra Prism-SWSH Darkness Ablaze	Pokémon Sword and Shield	Pokkén, GO	
2021	Cancelled due to COVID-19 pandemic					SM Team Up-SWSH Chilling Reign	Pokémon Sword and Shield	Pokkén, GO	
2022	August 18-21, 2022	ExCeL London		London, England	United Kingdom	Sword & Shield-SWSH Crown Zenith	Pokémon Sword and Shield	Pokkén, GO, UNITE	
2023	August 11-13, 2023	Pacifico Yokohama		Yokohama, Kanagawa	Japan	Sword & Shield-SWSH Crown Zenith	Pokémon Scarlet and Violet	GO, UNITE	
2024	August 16-18, 2024	Hawai'i Convention Center		Honolulu, Hawaii	United States	SWSH Brilliant Stars-SV Prismatic Evolutions	Pokémon Scarlet and Violet	GO, UNITE	
2025	August 15-17, 2025	Anaheim Convention Center		Anaheim, California	United States	Scarlet & Violet-ME Ascended Heroes	Pokémon Scarlet and Violet	GO, UNITE	
2026	August 28-30, 2026	Moscone Convention Center	Chase Center	San Francisco, California	United States	SV Temporal Forces-ME Perfect Order	Pokémon Champions	GO, UNITE	
2027	August 13-15, 2027	Singapore Expo	Singapore Indoor Stadium	Singapore	Singapore	TBA	Pokémon Champions	GO	

== Qualification ==
The qualifying process for the Pokémon World Championships varies each year and is dependent on a player's age division and the country in which they are located in. Players may also qualify to play on different days of the World Championships based on their performance in their respective qualifying programs; the best performing players will immediately advance to the second day of the World Championships playoffs (i.e. "Day 2") instead of playing through the first day (i.e. "Day 1").

=== Play! Pokémon program ===
Players located in a country with a Play! Pokémon program (i.e. in North America, Europe, Latin America and Oceania) compete in a regular schedule of tournaments for Championship Points and receive invitations when they meet a predetermined threshold of points at the end of the season.

In 2015, the Play! Pokémon program expanded to include countries from the continents of Latin America and Asia (except Japan and South Korea). However, on June 10, 2020, it was announced that Asia would no longer be part of the Play! Pokémon program and will have its own qualifying system towards the Pokémon World Championships.

As of September 1, 2026, the list of territories in each rating zone sanctioned to organize Play! Pokémon events are as follows:

North America	Latin America	Europe	Oceania	Middle East and Africa
Canada; United States; Puerto Rico	Argentina; Bolivia; Brazil; Chile; Colombia; Costa Rica; Dominican Republic; Ecuador; El Salvador; Guatemala; Mexico; Nicaragua; Panama; Paraguay; Peru; Trinidad and Tobago; Uruguay	Austria; Belgium; Bulgaria; Czech Republic; Denmark; Finland; France; Germany; Greece; Hungary; (Republic of Ireland) Ireland; Italy; Luxembourg; Malta; Netherlands; Norway; Poland; Portugal; Romania; Serbia; Slovakia; Spain; Sweden; Switzerland; United Kingdom; Guernsey; Isle of Man; Jersey	Australia; New Zealand	South Africa; United Arab Emirates

=== Pokémon GO Championship Series ===
Pokémon announced in October 2021 that Pokémon GO would be added during the 2022 World Championships, along with it a qualification system through the Pokémon GO Championship Series, where the top two head to the World Championships. Any trainer who reached Legend rank during Season 9 of the Pokémon GO Battle League would qualify for the GO Championship Series.

==== 2022 Championship Series ====
The 2022 Pokémon GO Championship Series is a series with a purpose of acting as a qualification system to the 2022 Pokémon World Championship. The series consists of events spread throughout the globe. The series is divided into the Senior's and Master's divisions. The series' format revolves around the Great League. Players can enter the championship either by attaining Legend rank during either Season 9 or Season 10 of the GO Battle League, or by registering via Play! Pokémon after the Legend-rank registration closes. Every event is divided between a regional or international event. The top Pokémon players at these events would be given an invitation to the 2022 World Championship. The earliest event began on 26 March, in Liverpool, with the latest being on 24 June, in Columbus, Ohio.

A list of events featured in the series is listed below:

GO Championship Series Events
Region	Event	Date	Location	Requirements
North America	Indianapolis Regional Championships	6–8 May 2022	Indiana Convention Center, Indiana	Legend rank in S9 or S10
North America	Vancouver Regional Championships	27–29 May 2022	Vancouver Convention Centre, Canada	Legend rank in S9 or S10
North America	Milwaukee Regional Championships	17–19 June 2022	Wisconsin Center, Wisconsin	Legend rank in S10
North America	North America International Championships	24–26 June 2022	Greater Columbus Convention Center, Ohio	Legend rank in S10
Europe	Liverpool Regional Championships	26–27 March 2022	Exhibition Centre Liverpool, United Kingdom	Legend rank in S9 or S10
Europe	Europe International Championships	22–24 April 2022	Messe Frankfurt, Germany	Legend rank in S9 or S10
Europe	Lille Regional Championships	21–22 May 2022	Zénith de Lille, France	Legend rank in S10
Europe	Bremen Regional Championships	28–29 May 2022	Die Glocke, Germany	Legend rank in S10
Oceania	Perth Regional Championships	21–22 May 2022	Arena Joondalup, Australia	Legend rank in S10
Oceania	Melbourne Regional Championships	11–12 June 2022	St Kilda Town Hall, Australia	Legend rank in S10

=== Pokémon Unite Championship Series ===
In January 2022, Pokémon Unite producer Masaaki Hoshino confirmed that the game would be part of the roster of games to be played at the World Championships in London. For the first season of the Pokémon Unite Championship Series, there will be eleven supported Regional Zones: North America, Central America, South America-East, South America-West, Europe, Oceania, Japan, South Korea, India, and the Asia-Pacific region. These events will only be open to players aged 16 or 18, depending on the region or country they are from.

In each month, a series of tournaments in each Regional Zone will be held. Like other games in the World Championships, players will earn Championship Points based on their finishing position in that month's tournament. The CP can be retained by players to allow for team changes as the season carries on. The team with the most points qualifies for the Regional Championships, and the top teams from the Regional Championships qualify for a chance to compete at the Pokémon World Championships.

In January 2023, there were changes to the competitive structure and Regional Zones. Pokémon World Championships nearly doubled available spots from 16, to 31 teams. Regional Zones controlled by TPCi were also changed, with Central America, South America-East and South America West being changed to LATAM North, LATAM South, and Brazil. TPC had also taken control of the India and Asia-Pacific Regional Zones, and split Asia-Pacific into 2 regions; Asia-Pacific East and Asia-Pacific West. For TPCi controlled regions, the previous month's top 4 did not auto qualify for the next month's tournament finals. Additionally, an extra monthly tournament was added, the April Cup. Championship Points were also changed to include top CP earners an invite to Pokémon World Championships, ranging from top 1 to 3 in top CP earners depending on how many invites were given for a region. For TPC controlled regions, their tournament circuit began in April, with 3 monthly qualifiers. The winners of these qualifiers then participated in Regionals to earn a spot for Pokémon World Championships.

Among those changes, both North America and Europe were also given their first regional LAN event. Europe had a LAN event for their Aeos Cup series at European International Championships. North America were given a regional LAN event at the North America International Championships.

In 2023, competing countries were divided into eight groups of four teams (groups A to H). Teams in each group play each another in a best-of-three series round-robin, with the top team advancing to the Top 8 knockout stage. The final draw took place virtually on the Pokémon Unite YouTube channel on July 28, 2023. The prize pool was $500,000 in USD and was distributed among the Top 16 finishers in the championship.

=== Japan & South Korea ===
Tournaments in Japan and South Korea are organized independently from Play! Pokémon, and as such, players from these countries have a different system of qualification.

In Japan, players compete for an invite to the Japan National Championships by playing in major qualifier or online tournaments held throughout the season. The best performing players of the Japan National Championships will then be selected to represent Japan in the Pokémon World Championships.

In South Korea, the style of qualification for the World Championships changes frequently. For example, in 2015, players would compete in the Korean National Championships and earn a World Championships invitation based on their standing in the tournament. However, in 2019, players would compete in tournaments organized by the Korean League and earn an invite based on the number of points they had accumulated by the end of the season.

=== Other ===
There are other less common methods of qualifying for the World Championships which include finishing at least top 4 or better in the prior year's World Championships or by participating in a single-elimination tournament known as the Last Chance Qualifier at the location of the World Championships itself.

== List of World Champions ==
=== Trading Card Game (TCG) ===
Year	Juniors (U11)	Seniors (11-14)	Masters (15+)	Ref.
2004	(Japan) Hayato Sato	(Japan) Takuya Yoneda	(Japan) Tsuguyoshi Yamato	
2005	(United States) Curran Hill	(United States) Stuart Benson	(United States) Jeremy Maron	
2006	(Japan) Hiroki Yano	(Finland) Miska Saari	(United States) Jason Klaczynski	
2007	(Japan) Jun Hasebe	(United States) Jeremy Scharff-Kim	(Finland) Tom Roos	
2008	(United States) Tristan Robinson	(United States) Dylan Lefavour	(United States) Jason Klaczynski	
2009	(Japan) Tsubasa Nakamura	(Japan) Takuto Itagaki	(United States) Stephen Silvestro	
2010	(Japan) Yuka Furusawa	(Canada) Jacob Lesage	(Japan) Yuta Komatsuda	
2011	(Brazil) Gustavo Wada	(Australia) Christopher Kan	(United States) David Cohen	
2012	(Japan) Shuto Itagaki	(Canada) Chase Moloney	(Portugal) Igor Costa	
2013	(Czech Republic) Ondřej Kujal	(Australia) Kaiwen Cabbabe	(United States) Jason Klaczynski	
2014	(Japan) Haruto Kobayashi	(United States) Trent Orndorff	(Canada) Andrew Estrada	
2015	(Canada) Rowan Stavenow	(United States) Patrick Martinez	(United States) Jacob Van Wagner	
2016	(Japan) Shunto Sadahiro	(Denmark) Jesper Eriksen	(Japan) Shintaro Ito	
2017	(Norway) Tobias Strømdahl	(United States) Zachary Bokhari	(Argentina) Diego Cassiraga	
2018	(Japan) Naohito Inoue	(Denmark) Magnus Pedersen	(Germany) Robin Schulz	
2019	(Japan) Haruki Miyamoto	(Germany) Kaya Lichtleitner	(Australia) Henry Brand	
2022	(Japan) Rikuto Ohashi	(United States) Liam Halliburton	(Czech Republic) Ondřej Škubal	
2023	(Taiwan) Shao Tong Yen	(Brazil) Gabriel Fernandez	(United States) Vance Kelley	
2024	(Japan) Sakuya Ota	(United States) Evan Pavelski	(Chile) Fernando Cifuentes	
2025	(Japan) Yuya Okita	(China) Fuguan Liao	(Canada) Riley McKay	
2026	(Japan) Yuta Araki	(Australia) Jake Ng	(United States) Andrew Hedrick	

=== Video Game Championships (VGC) ===
Year	Juniors (U11)	Seniors (11-14)	Masters (15+)
2008	(United States) Knight Silvayne	(Japan) Izuru Yoshimura	N/A
2009	(United States) Jeremiah Fan	(Japan) Kazuyuki Tsuji	N/A
2010	(Japan) Shota Yamamoto	(United States) Ray Rizzo	N/A
2011	(United States) Brian Hough	(United States) Kamran Jahadi	(United States) Ray Rizzo
2012	(United States) Abram Burrows	(United States) Toler Webb	(United States) Ray Rizzo
2013	(United States) Brendan Zheng	(United States) Hayden McTavish	(Italy) Arash Ommati
2014	(Japan) Kota Yamamoto	(United States) Nikolai Zielinski	(South Korea) Se Jun Park
2015	(Japan) Kotone Yasue	(United Kingdom) Mark McQuillan	(Japan) Shoma Honami
2016	(United States) Cory Connor	(United States) Carson Confer	(United States) Wolfe Glick
2017	(Australia) Nicholas Kan	(South Korea) Hong Juyoung	(Japan) Ryota Otsubo
2018	(Japan) Wonn Lee	(United States) James Evans	(Ecuador) Paul Ruiz
2019	(Taiwan) Pi Wu	(Japan) Ko Tsukide	(Japan) Naoto Mizobuchi
2022	(Japan) Kosaku Miyamoto	(Japan) Yasuharu Shimizu	(Portugal) Eduardo Cunha
2023	(Japan) Sora Ebisawa	(Japan) Tomoya Ogawa	(Japan) Shohei Kimura
2024	(United States) Kevin Han	(Japan) Ray Yamanaka	(Italy) Luca Ceribelli
2025	(United States) Luke Whittier	(United States) Kevin Han	(United States) Giovanni Cischke
2026	(Japan) Kazuki Kage	(United Kingdom) Vikram Thiagarajan	(Japan) Takuma Yamazaki

=== Pokémon Go ===
The under-17 age division was discontinued after the 2022 season. All participants of any age now compete in the same tournament.

All tournament battles use the Great League battle format (all Pokémon must be below 1,500 Combat Power.)

Year	Seniors (U17)	Masters (17+)
2022	(Switzerland) MEweedle	(Germany) DancingRob
2023	N/A	(United States) ItsAXN
2024	N/A	(Hong Kong) Yekai0904
2025	N/A	(India) Beelzeboy
2026	N/A	(Japan) GGs489hiromaru

=== Retired games ===
==== Pokkén Tournament & Pokkén Tournament DX ====
Year	Seniors (U17)	Masters (17+)
2016	(United Kingdom) Woomy!gun (Josh Simmonite)	(Japan) Potetin (Masami Sato)
2017	N/A	(Japan) Tonosama (Hisaharu Abe)
2018	(Japan) Kato (Kato Yusuke)	(United States) ThankSwalot (Jacob Waller)
2019	(United States) Ashgreninja1 (Colin Jones)	(Japan) Subutan (Hiroki Ishida)
2022	(United Kingdom) Fruitprime (Reuben Staples)	(United States) Shadowcat (Davon Amos-Hall)

==== Pokémon Unite ====
Year	Team	Players				
2022	BLVKHVND	Elo (Angelo Huang)	Junglebook (Nicholas Kim)	Kyriaos (Kihyun Lee)	Overlord98 (William Byrnes III)	Slashcan (Sean Tucker)
2023	Luminosity Gaming	Elo (Angelo Huang)	Kyriaos (Kihyun Lee)	Overlord (William Byrnes III)	Rhinne (Amrit Rama)	Slash (Sean Tucker)
2024	(Japan) Fennel	(Japan) Tongg (Haruki Yoshiura)	(Japan) Lucapo (Yuma Sato)	(Japan) Mashio (Mashika Shirakawa)	(Japan) Yume (Yumeto Tanabe)	(Japan) Pyi (Shouki Takada)
2025	(Peru) PERÚ Unite	(Peru) DrakenN (Jesús Vásquez)	(Peru) Zynuz (Erick Bartolo)	(Peru) Anemo (Jose Arias)	(Peru) KHEA (Axel Rivas)	(Peru) Tempo (Jeremy Rivas)
2026	(Japan) ZETA DIVISION	(Japan) Nomu (Shoya Wada)	(Japan) Rom (Kaito Nagao)	(Japan) Vitoppo (Yushi Kaneko)	(Japan) Mizu (Yuto Tsuda)	(Japan) ResTA (Taichi Iida)

== 2014 World Championships ==
2014 Pokémon World Championships
- 2014
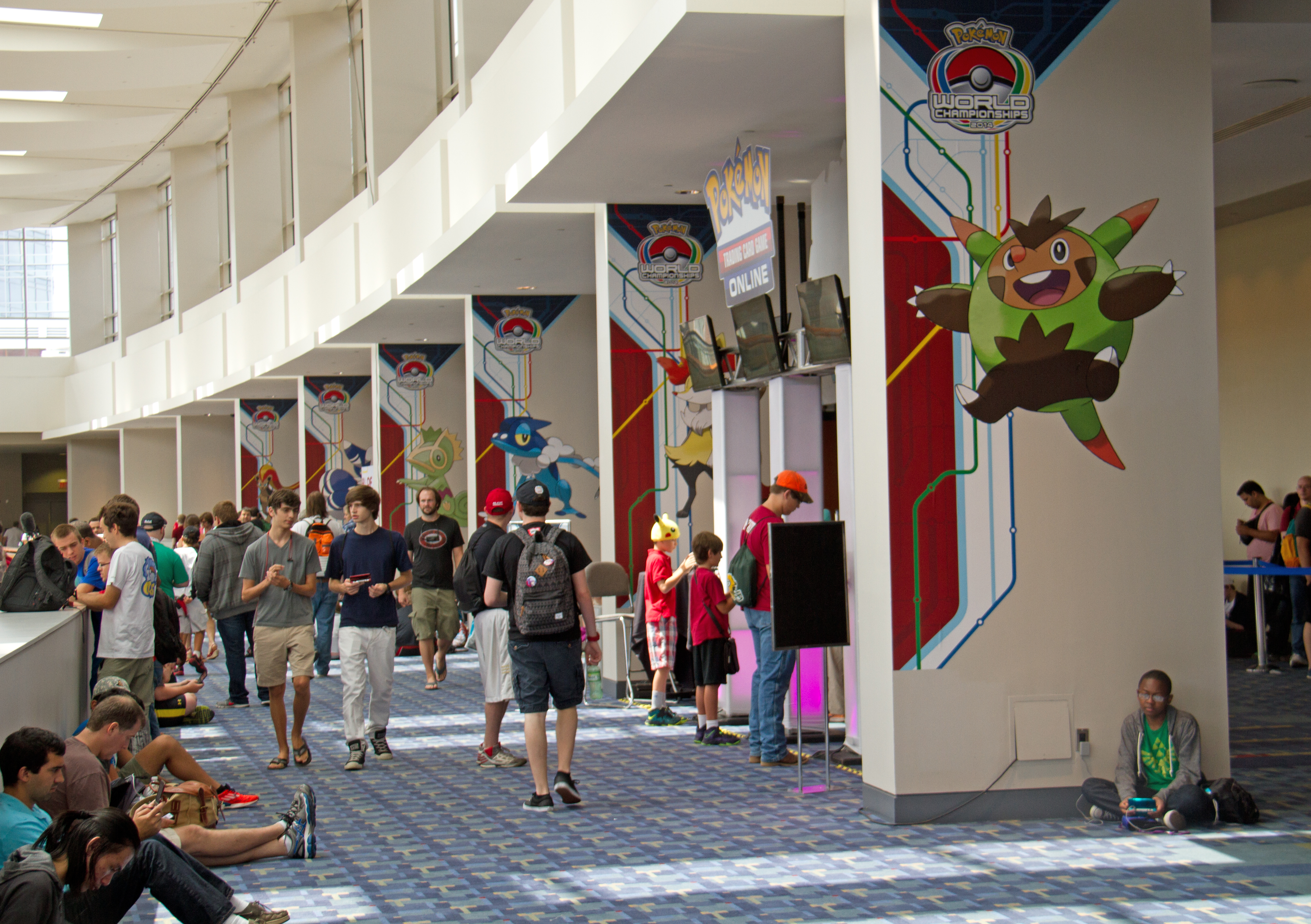
- Attendees of the 2014 World Championships

Tournament information
- Location: Washington, D.C.
- Dates: August 13–15
- Administrator: Play! Pokémon
- Tournament format(s): Swiss rounds, knock-out finals
- Venue: Walter E. Washington Convention Center
- Participants: 155
- Purse: US$5,000 in scholarships

Final positions
- Champions: (South Korea) Se Jun Park (Masters) (United States) Nikolai Zielinski (Seniors) (Japan) Kota Yamamoto (Juniors)
- Runner-up: (United States) Jeudy Azzarelli (Masters) (United Kingdom) Mark Mcquillan (Seniors) (United States) London Swan (Juniors)

Tournament statistics
- Matches played: 481 matches in 3 divisions
- Attendance: 3,000

The 2014 Pokémon World Championships was the sixth annual edition of the championships. The event took place in the Walter E. Washington Convention Center on Washington, D.C., alongside the 2014 Pokémon Trading Card Game World Championship who were in their eleventh edition.

The tournament was streamed via Twitch for the first time in the tournament history and reached a viewership of more than 800,000.

The defending Video Game champions were Arash Ommati from Italy (Masters Division), Hayden McTavish from the United States (Senior Division), and Brendan Zheng from the United States (Junior Division). The opening ceremony of the event was attended by Junichi Masuda, the video game designer for the Pokémon franchise and a member of the board of directors of Game Freak.

The finals match of the Masters division is best known and remembered within the Pokémon community for Se Jun Park's victory with the inclusion and use of a Pachirisu on his team.

=== 2014 qualification ===
The qualification process for the 2014 Pokémon World Championships was primarily based on Championship Points accumulated by players from official Play! Pokémon tournaments such as Premier Challenges, Regional Championships and National Championships. In addition, the top 4 players of the 2013 Pokémon World Championships in each division, and the top 4 players of a tournament known as the 'Last Chance Qualifier' will also receive an invitation to play in the World Championships.

The invitations for the Masters Division of the tournament were distributed in the following manner:

- Top 4 players from the 2013 Pokémon World Championships,
- Top 32 players from Europe with the most Championship Points,
- Top 16 players from North America with the most Championship Points,
- Top 4 players from Australia with the most Championship Points,
- Top 2 players from South Africa with the most Championship Points,
- Top 8 players from the Japan National Championships,
- Top 2 players from the South Korea National Championships, and
- Top 4 players from the Last Chance Qualifier, a tournament held the day before the World Championships in the same venue.

Most of the invitations did not include a fully paid trip to the tournament, and as a result several players could not attend the tournament.

=== 2014 tournament structure ===
==== Players per country ====
- Masters Division

Country	Zone	# of Players
United States	North America	22
Germany	Europe	10
United Kingdom	Europe	7
Japan	Japan	7
Australia	Australia	4
Italy	Europe	3
Spain	Europe	2
South Korea	South Korea	2
South Africa	South Africa	1
Canada	North America	1
Ireland	Europe	1

==== Results ====
Six rounds of Swiss was played by 60 players in the tournament, and each round was played with a set of best-of-three matches. The top 8 players after the Swiss rounds advances to the best-of-three Single Elimination matches.

The defending World Champion Arash Ommati and former three-time World Champion Ray Rizzo did not advance to the single elimination rounds.

- Masters Division

Quarterfinals
1	(Japan) Ryosuke Kosuge	1
8	(Germany) Markus Liu	2
5	(United States) Jeudy Azzarelli	2
4	(United Kingdom) Lee Provost	0
3	(Spain) Miguel Marti de la Torre	0
6	(South Korea) Sejun Park	2
7	(Australia) Dayne O'Meara	0
2	(United States) Collin Heier	2

Semifinals
8	(Germany) Markus Liu	0
5	(United States) Jeudy Azzarelli	2
6	(South Korea) Sejun Park	2
2	(United States) Collin Heier	0

Finals
5	(United States) Jeudy Azzarelli	0
6	(South Korea) Sejun Park	2

=== Final standings ===
Place	Masters Division	Senior Division	Junior Division
1st	(South Korea) Se Jun Park	(United States) Nikolai Zielinski	(Japan) Kota Yamamoto
2nd	(United States) Jeudy Azzarelli	(United Kingdom) Mark Mcquillan	(United States) London Swan
3rd	(United States) Collin Heier	(Spain) Eric Rios	(Japan) Haruka Narita
4th	(Germany) Markus Liu	(United States) Ian McLaughlin	(Japan) Riku Miyoshi

== 2015 World Championships ==
2015 Pokémon World Championships
- 2015

Tournament information
- Location: Boston, Massachusetts
- Dates: August 21–23
- Administrator: Play! Pokémon
- Tournament format(s): Swiss rounds, knock-out finals
- Venue: Hynes Convention Center
- Purse: $500,000 in scholarships

Final positions
- Champions: (Japan) Shoma Honami (Masters) (United Kingdom) Mark McQuillan (Seniors) (Japan) Kotone Yasue (Juniors)
- Runner-up: (Japan) Hideyuki Taida (Masters) (Japan) Koki Honda (Seniors) (South Korea) Ryan Jaehyun Park (Juniors)

The 2015 Pokémon World Championships was the seventh annual edition of the championships. The event was held alongside the Pokémon Trading Card Game World Championships at the Hynes Convention Center in Boston, Massachusetts.

The tournament was transmitted with live streaming from the official Pokémon Twitch channel. The defending Video Game champions for the year were Se Jun Park from South Korea (Masters Division), Nikolai Zielinsky from the United States (Senior Division) and Kota Yamamoto from Japan (Junior Division).

=== 2015 qualification ===
Players could only gain an invitation to play in the Video Game World Championships by either being the 2014 Pokémon World Champions, or by obtaining enough Championship Points in their respective geographic zone designated by Play! Pokémon. However, the only exception to this rule are for players from Japan and South Korea, as their tournaments are not overseen by Play! Pokémon and their invites are governed through a different system of qualification.

Since 2014, players were able to earn Championship Points from various tournaments within their geographical region. The tournaments vary in scale, ranging from local Premier Challenges to state-level Regional Championships and finally the large-scale National Championships. The number of points awarded varies with scale, and players who earn these points are ranked and divided into zones such as North America, Europe and South Africa. This year, two new zones (Latin America and Asia-Pacific) were introduced.

The 2015 Pokémon Video Game World Championship was intended to be played under two Swiss tournaments and one single-elimination tournament which would then determine the 2015 World Champions. As such, there are two types of invites:

- a regular 'Day One' invite, and
- a 'Day Two' invite, which allows players to receive a bye for the Swiss tournament on the first day.

As an example, the invitations for the Masters Division were distributed as follows:

- 'Day One' invitation (by Championship Points):
  - Top 40 players from North America
  - Top 60 players from Europe
  - Top 18 players from Latin America
  - Top 18 players from Asia-Pacific
  - Top 2 players from South Africa
- 'Day Two' invitation (i.e. 'Day One' bye)
  - 2014 World Champion
  - Top 8 players from North America by Championship Points.
  - Top 16 players from Europe by Championship Points.
  - Top 2 players from Latin America by Championship Points.
  - Top 2 players from Asia-Pacific by Championship Points.
  - Top 2 players from South Africa by Championship Points.
  - Top 4 players of the South Korea Video Game National Championships.
  - Top 8 players of the Japan Video Game National Championships.

=== 2015 tournament structure ===
The Video Game Championships consisted of two Swiss tournaments and one single elimination tournament played across three days.

On Friday (Day 1), all players who earned an invitation without a Day 1 bye were entered into a Swiss tournament, where players with two or fewer losses would advance onto the next round. The second Swiss tournament was then played on Saturday (Day 2), where players who advanced from Day 1 were joined by players who received an invitation with a Day 1 bye.

At the end of the Day 2 Swiss tournament, the top eight players played in single elimination rounds until the last two remain. The finals took place on Sunday (Day 3).

=== Final standings (Video Game Championships) ===
Place	Junior Division (U13)	Senior Division (13-16)	Masters Division (17+)
1st	(Japan) Kotone Yasue	(United Kingdom) Mark Mcquillan	(Japan) Shoma Honami
2nd	(South Korea) Ryan Jaehyun Park	(Japan) Koki Honda	(Japan) Hideyuki Taida
3rd	(Japan) Shu Harsaki	(Austria) Max Marjanovic	(Japan) Yosuke Isagi
4th	(Japan) Shuhei Tsukano	(United States) Kylie Chua	(Japan) Naohito Mizobuchi

=== Weapons controversy ===
During the 2015 World Championships, two Trading Card Game competitors from Iowa (Kevin Norton, 18, and James Stumbo, 27) brought weapons in their vehicle, which were recovered by the police. The two posted status updates and images of their weaponry on social media, which were noticed by various Pokémon fans who treated them as supposed threats against the tournament. The updates were reported to the Boston Regional Intelligence Center (BRIC), who promptly seized their automobile and then stopped them at the door and barred them from entering the Hynes Convention Center on Thursday evening. Police executed a search warrant on Friday and Norton and Stumbo were arrested at their Red Roof Inn room in Saugus just after midnight on Saturday, August 22, 2015. The two were arrested on charges of unlicensed possession of firearms and ammunition, and were initially held without bail. The weapons recovered were a recently purchased Remington shotgun, an AR-15, a hunting knife and several hundred rounds of ammunition. They pleaded not guilty at their arraignment on November 10, 2015, and their bail was set at $150,000. On December 2, 2015, their trial was set for May 9, 2016, however, in early April 2016, their trial was postponed to November 2016. Following the release of Pokémon Go in July 2016, Stumbo's attorney indicated that the case would be resolved soon. Norton and Stumbo were later sentenced to two years in prison with an additional two years probation once their prison term ends.

== 2016 World Championships ==
2016 Pokémon World Championships
- 2016

Tournament information
- Location: San Francisco, California
- Dates: August 19–21
- Administrator: Play! Pokémon
- Tournament format(s): Swiss rounds, knock-out finals
- Venue: San Francisco Marriott Marquis
- Purse: $500,000

Final positions
- Champions: (United States) Wolfe Glick (VGC Masters) (United States) Carson Confer (VGC Seniors) (United States) Cory Connor (VGC Juniors) (Japan) Shintaro Ito (TCG Masters) (Denmark) Jesper Eriksen (TCG Seniors) (Japan) Shunto Sadahiro (TCG Juniors)
- Runner-up: (United States) Jonathan Evans (VGC Masters) (Japan) Yuki Wata (VGC Seniors) (Japan) Shu Harasaki (VGC Juniors) (United States) Cody Walinski (TCG Masters) (United States) Connor Pederson (TCG Seniors) (Japan) Riku Ushirosako (TCG Juniors)

The 2016 Pokémon World Championships was the eighth annual edition of the championships. The event was held at the San Francisco Marriott Marquis in San Francisco, California, from August 19 to August 21. For the first time in the tournament history, the Pokkén Tournament invitational was featured alongside the Video Game Championships (VGC) and Trading Card Game (TCG) tournaments. Side events and an official store with event merchandise occurred alongside the event.

The defending Video Game champions were Shoma Honami from Japan (Masters Division), Mark McQuillan from the United Kingdom (Senior Division) and Kotone Yasue from Japan (Junior Division). The defending Trading Card Game champions were Jacob Van Wagner from the United States (Masters Division), Patrick Martinez from the United States (Senior Division), and Rowan Stavenow from Canada.

=== Age divisions and qualifications ===
Both the Pokémon VGC and TCG were divided into three age divisions: the Junior Division (born 2005 or later), the Senior Division (born between 2001 and 2004), and the Masters Division (born 2000 or earlier). For the Pokkén Tournament invitational, players were grouped into either the Senior Division (born 2001 or later) or Masters Division (born 2000 or earlier).

The process of obtaining an invitation is primarily based on Championship Points. Players could earn Championship Points by performing in select online and live tournaments held throughout the 2016 season (between September 2015 and July 2016). Players from Japan and South Korea were excluded from this rule as these countries had their own method of qualification not based on Championship Points.

Play! Pokémon divided players into five different rating zones: US and Canada, Europe, Latin America, Asia-Pacific and South Africa. Different zones had different Championship Points requirements due to the distribution of events around the world.

There are two possible invitations players could obtain:

- a regular 'Day One' invite, and
- a 'Day Two' invite, which allowed players to acquire a 'Day One' bye and automatically enter the second Swiss tournament.

'Day Two' invites were usually accompanied by travel awards and stipends paid by Play! Pokémon.

==== Trading Card Game Championship qualifications ====
The following table shows the Championship Points requirement for an invitation to the 2016 World Championships:

Zones	Masters Division (17+)	Senior Division (13-16)	Junior Division (U13)	Day Two (Ranking)
US and Canada	300 CP	250 CP	200 CP	Top 16 Players in each division
Europe	300 CP	250 CP	200 CP	Top 22 Players in each division
Latin America	200 CP	150 CP	100 CP	Top 8 Players in each division
Asia-Pacific	200 CP	150 CP	100 CP	Top 8 Players in each division
South Africa	200 CP	150 CP	100 CP	None

Players in Japan and South Korea were awarded invitations based on each country's organized play system.

==== Video Game Championship qualifications ====
For the Masters Division, the following table lists the Championship Points requirement for an invitation to the 2016 World Championships:

Zones	Day One	Day Two (Ranking)
US and Canada	350 CP	Top 8 of the Zone
Europe	275 CP	Top 16 of the Zone
Latin America	150 CP	Top 4 of the Zone
Asia-Pacific	200 CP	Top 4 of the Zone
South Africa	400 CP	None

=== 2016 tournament structure ===
The Video Game Championships consisted of two Swiss tournaments and one single elimination tournament played across three days.

On Friday (Day 1), all players who earned an invitation without a Day 1 bye were entered into a Swiss tournament, where players with two or fewer losses would advance onto the next round. The second Swiss tournament was then played on Saturday (Day 2), where players who advanced from Day 1 were joined by players who received an invitation with a Day 1 bye.

At the end of the Day 2 Swiss tournament, players with two or fewer losses advanced to play in single elimination rounds until the last two remain. The finals took place on Sunday (Day 3).

==== Final standings (Video Game Championships) ====
Place	Junior Division (U13)	Senior Division (13-16)	Masters Division (17+)
1st	(United States) Cory Connor	(United States) Carson Confer	(United States) Wolfe Glick
2nd	(Japan) Shu Harasaki	(Japan) Yuki Wata	(United States) Jonathan Evans
3rd	(Japan) Rikuto Noda	(United States) Mostafa Afr	(Germany) Markus Stadter
4th	(United States) Enzo Reci	(Japan) Kazuki Ogushi	(Portugal) Eduardo Cunha

==== Final standings (Trading Card Game) ====
Place	Junior Division (U13)	Senior Division (13-16)	Masters Division (17+)
1st	(Japan) Shunto Sadahiro	(Denmark) Jesper Eriksen	(Japan) Shintaro Ito
2nd	(Japan) Riku Ushirosako	(United States) Connor Pedersen	(United States) Cody Walinski
3rd	(United States) Roan Godfrey-Robbins	(Indonesia) Rafli Attar	(United States) Samuel Hough
4th	(Japan) Yuta Ozawa	(Brazil) Raphael Souto	(United States) Ross Cawthon
