= 2023 Pokémon World Championships =

18th edition of the Pokémon World Championships

- Official logo of the event
- Host city: Yokohama, Japan
- Motto: Challenge the World! (Japanese: 世界に挑戦してみよう！)
- Events: 8 in 4 games
- Opening: August 11, 2023
- Closing: August 13, 2023
- Main venue: Pacifico Yokohama
- Website: worlds.pokemon.com

The 2023 Pokémon World Championships (Japanese: 2023 ポケモンワールドチャンピオンシップス) was an international multi-game event held from August 11, 2023 to August 13, 2023 in Yokohama, Japan, following its announcement as the host city during the closing ceremony of the 2022 edition in London.

The Games were the 18th edition of the Pokémon World Championships, following the 2022 Pokémon World Championships in London. Yokohama is the first city in Japan and in Asia to host the Pokémon World Championships. The Games was also the first time that the Pokémon World Championships was held consecutively outside of North America.

The Pokémon Company (TPC) removed Pokkén Tournament from the games lineup after the game has been in the Pokémon World Championships since 2016. This was also the first time TPC removed a game from the main events. The release of Pokémon Scarlet and Violet has also adjusted all of the main events through new Pokémon, abilities, and moves.

Hosts Japan swept the VGC (Pokémon Scarlet and Violet) podium, winning at the Juniors, Seniors, and Masters level. This is the fourth VGC podium sweep in the history of the Pokémon World Championships, with the other three podium sweeps occurring in 2011, 2012, and 2016, all done by the United States. In Pokémon Unite, Luminosity Gaming defended their title, still standing as the only Esports team with a world championship in Pokémon Unite. In Pokémon Trading Card Game, Brazil had 25 entrants, and was one of the three countries with 20+ entrants (behind hosts Japan and the United States). In addition, Taiwan won their first championship in TCG at the Juniors level. In Pokémon Go, the United States swept the podium. The closing ceremony announced that the United States will host the 2024 Pokémon World Championships for the 16th time in Honolulu.

Also at the closing ceremony, The Pokémon Company announced meta-defining news for each event in the games lineup. In Pokémon Go, Pokémon from the Paldea region from Pokémon Scarlet and Violet will be integrated in the game in September 2023. In Pokémon Trading Card Game, Paradox Pokémon from Pokémon Scarlet and Violet will be released in November 2023. In Pokémon Unite, Blaziken, Mimikyu, and Meowscarada will be the next batch of new Pokémon. In Pokémon Scarlet and Violet, more information was revealed for the DLC, most notably that all starters from every Pokémon region will be available when the second DLC releases in Winter 2023.

== The Championships ==
2023 Pokémon World Championships games lineup
- Pokémon Go
- Pokémon Scarlet and Violet
  - Juniors (Born in 2011 or later)
  - Seniors (Born from 2007 to 2010)
  - Masters (Born in 2006 or earlier)
- Pokémon Trading Card Game
  - Juniors (Born in 2011 or later)
  - Seniors (Born from 2007 to 2010)
  - Masters (Born in 2006 or earlier)
- Pokémon Unite

=== Games ===
The tournament featured eight events in four games. Pokémon Scarlet and Violet made its debut as the ninth Pokémon video game in the Pokémon World Championships. For Pokémon Scarlet and Violet and the Pokémon Trading Card Game, there were three events for both games where each event was dedicated to a specific age division. For Pokémon Unite and Pokémon Go, there was one event each where participants must be at least 16 and 13 years old to participate, respectively, although countries may require participants to be older.

Pokémon Scarlet and Violet introduced a new mainline battle mechanic called Terastallization, where Pokémon have the ability to change their type at any point during the battle. This is the fourth mainline battle mechanic introduced in the Pokémon video game series, after Mega Evolution in Pokémon X and Y, Z-Moves in Pokémon Sun and Moon, and Dynamax in Pokémon Sword and Shield. The Terastallization phenomenon, abilities, and new Pokémon has had substantial impact in the other titles in the Games, such as Terastal Pokémon in TCG. This is also the first time that a new ruleset (called "Regulation D") was first implemented at the Pokémon World Championships, rather than during the regular season.

== Calendar ==
All times and dates use Japan Standard Time (UTC+9)

OC	Opening ceremony	●	Event competitions	1	Championship	CC	Closing ceremony

August 2023	11th Fri	12th Sat	13th Sun	Events
Ceremonies	OC		CC	—N/a
Pokémon Go	●	●	1	1
Pokémon Scarlet and Violet	●	●	3	3
Pokémon Trading Card Game	●	●	3	3
Pokémon Unite	●	1		1

== Summary ==
=== Medalists ===
Games	First	Second	Third
Pokémon Go details	ItsAXN; United States	xXRubixMasterXx; United States	wdage United States
Pokémon TCG – Juniors details	Shao Tong Yen; Taiwan	Gabriel Torres; Brazil	Hayashi Yukito; Japan
Pokémon TCG – Seniors details	Gabriel Fernandez; Brazil	Sydney de Bruijn; Netherlands	Yuya Tada; Japan
Pokémon TCG – Masters details	Vance Kelley; United States	Tord Reklev; Norway	Michael Pramawat; United States
Pokémon VGC – Juniors details	Sora Ebisawa; Japan	Kohei Ukai; Japan	Pietro Nihal Kaludura; Italy
Pokémon VGC – Seniors details	Tomoya Ogawa; Japan	Robbie Schaaij; Netherlands	Yuta Okada; Japan
Pokémon VGC – Masters details	Shohei Kimura; Japan	Michael Kelsch; Germany	Mao Harada; Japan
Pokémon Unite details	Luminosity Gaming (United States) Sean Tucker (United States) William Byrnes III (United States) Kihyun Lee (Canada) Angelo Huang (United States) Amrit Rama (United States) Nicholas Kim (alt.)	OMO Abyssinian (Philippines) Jose Miguel Ringpis Liban (Philippines) Joe Daryl Padao Maghanoy (Philippines) Luis John Felizarte (Philippines) Michael Vaughn Ocio (Philippines) Joshua De Leon (Philippines) Justine De Guzman (alt.)	Oyasumi Makuro (Japan) Yudai Koseko (Japan) Shouki Takada (Japan) Yumeto Tanabe (Japan) Futo Kamikido (Japan) Kaito Nagao

== Pokémon Go ==
The Top 108 Pokémon Go players in the world were invited and competed in group stage format to determine a Top 16 knockout stage.

Upper round 1	Upper round 2	Upper final	Final
ElCheasdasd (CHI)	2
Inadequance (NED)	0
ElCheasdasd (CHI)	0
wdage (USA)	2
wdage (USA)	2
Avrip (AUS)	1
wdage (USA)	2
ItsAXN (USA)	3
Luminous0430 (JPN)	0
ItsAXN (USA)	2
ItsAXN (USA)	2
xXRubixMasterXx (USA)	0
xXRubixMasterXx (USA)	2
chiodoSH01 (JPN)	1
ItsAXN (USA)	3
xXRubixMasterXx (USA)	1
Lower round 1	Lower round 2	Lower round 3	Lower round 4	Lower round 5	Lower final
chiodoSH01 (JPN)	2
ElCheasdasd (CHI)	2
HumanCatcherBug (DEN)	0	ISHIKAWABOY (JPN)	1
chiodoSH01 (JPN)	2	chiodoSH01 (JPN)	1
ISHIKAWABOY (JPN)	2
Luminous0430 (JPN)	1	wdage (USA)	2
Luminous0430 (JPN)	2
ElCheasdasd (CHI)	0	xXRubixMasterXx (USA)	3
TontonBatteuse (FRA)	2	TontonBatteuse (FRA)	1
xXRubixMasterXx (USA)	2
RicFlareon (AUS)	0
Avrip (AUS)	0
xXRubixMasterXx (USA)	2
Paulasha97 (ESP)	0	Scafo99 (ITA)	2
Scafo99 (ITA)	2	Scafo99 (ITA)	0
Scafo99 (ITA)	2
ROROI1230 (KOR)	0
Inadequance (NED)	1
Auburnnnn (USA)	1	ROROI1230 (KOR)	2
ROROI1230 (KOR)	2

== Pokémon TCG ==
=== Participating nations ===
A total of 348 players from 36 nations competed in the Pokémon Trading Card Game across three age divisions.

Participating nations
- Argentina (5)
- Australia (17)
- Belgium (3)
- Brazil (25)
- Canada (15)
- Chile (6)
- China (1)
- Czech Republic (2)
- Denmark (5)
- Finland (5)
- France (8)
- Germany (6)
- Hong Kong (7)
- Indonesia (2)
- Israel (2)
- Italy (14)
- Japan (69) (host)
- Mexico (2)
- Malaysia (1)
- Netherlands (8)
- Norway (1)
- New Zealand (2)
- Peru (2)
- Philippines (1)
- Poland (6)
- Portugal (2)
- Singapore (2)
- Slovakia (2)
- South Africa (5)
- South Korea (17)
- Spain (6)
- Switzerland (1)
- Thailand (5)
- Taiwan (11)
- United Kingdom (18)
- United States (66)

=== Juniors ===
The Top 93 Pokémon Trading Card Game players born 2011 or later were invited and competed in a Swiss-system format to determine the Top 8 knockout stage.

Quarter-finals
Hayashi Y. (JPN)	2
Haruku U. (JPN)	1
Kazusa Y. (JPN)	1
Shao Tong Y. (TAI)	2
Gabriel T. (BRA)	2
Kingsley C. (AUS)	1
Junwon C. (KOR)	0
Hatsuto K. (JPN)	2

Semi-finals
Hayashi Y. (JPN)	0
Shao Tong Y. (TAI)	2
Gabriel T. (BRA)	2
Hatsuto K. (JPN)	0

Final
Shao Tong Y. (TAI)	2
Gabriel T. (BRA)	0

=== Seniors ===
The Top 85 Pokémon Trading Card Game players born between 2007 and 2010 were invited and competed in a Swiss-system format to determine the Top 8 knockout stage.

Quarter-finals
Akinori A. (JPN)	1
Sydney D.B. (NED)	2
Polaris A. (USA)	1
Yuya T. (JPN)	2
Lucas J. (BRA)	0
Sechan O. (KOR)	2
Gabriel F. (BRA)	2
Rune H. (BEL)	0

Semi-finals
Sydney D.B. (NED)	2
Yuya T. (JPN)	0
Sechan O. (KOR)	0
Gabriel F. (BRA)	2

Final
Sydney D.B. (NED)	0
Gabriel F. (BRA)	2

=== Masters ===
The Top 170 Pokémon Trading Card Game players born between born 2006 or earlier were invited and competed in a Swiss-system format to determine the Top 8 knockout stage.

Quarter-finals
Vance Kelley (USA)	2
Pang Kai Hing (HKG)	0
Azul García Griego (USA)	2
Dionsius Lee (SGP)	1
Tord Reklev (NOR)	2
Victor Manuel García Montes (MEX)	1
Shoichi Saito (AUS)	1
Michael Pramawat (USA)	2

Semi-finals
Vance Kelley (USA)	2
Azul García Griego (USA)	1
Tord Reklev (NOR)	2
Michael Pramawat (USA)	0

Final
Vance Kelley (USA)	2
Tord Reklev (NOR)	1

== Pokémon VGC ==
Qualification for the video game competition was based on Championship Points earned during the 2023 Championship Series. In the Masters division, a Day One invitation required 250 points in the European rating zone or 300 points in the United States and Canada rating zone. Certain highly ranked players received direct invitations to Day Two.

The VGC competition used two days of Swiss-system play followed by a single-elimination knockout stage. Players who finished Friday with no more than two losses and no ties advanced to Saturday, where they joined players holding direct Day Two invitations. Match records were reset for Saturday's Swiss rounds, after which players with no more than two losses and no ties advanced to the knockout stage. The two remaining finalists competed on Sunday.

The VGC knockout stage was disrupted by network disconnections, with some matches requiring sudden-death games. Several competitors were also disqualified for using Pokémon that violated tournament legality rules. In an interview on the podcast Miauz Genau!, Masters finalist Michael Kelsch described a disconnection during his round-of-16 match, which he eventually won in a sudden-death tiebreaker.

=== Participating nations ===
A total of 256 players from 33 nations competed in Pokémon Scarlet and Violet across three age divisions.

Participating nations
- Argentina (2)
- Australia (14)
- Austria (1)
- Belgium (2)
- Brazil (4)
- Canada (6)
- Chile (5)
- China (2)
- Denmark (1)
- Ecuador (2)
- France (9)
- Germany (8)
- Hong Kong (1)
- Ireland (1)
- Israel (1)
- Italy (19)
- Japan (90) (host)
- Luxembourg (1)
- Malaysia (2)
- Netherlands (2)
- New Zealand (1)
- Peru (3)
- Philippines (1)
- Paraguay (1)
- Portugal (1)
- Singapore (1)
- South Korea (10)
- Spain (10)
- Sweden (1)
- Thailand (1)
- Taiwan (1)
- United Kingdom (12)
- United States (41)

=== Juniors ===
The Top 69 Pokémon Scarlet and Violet players born 2011 or later were invited and competed in a Swiss-system format to determine the Top 8 knockout stage.

Quarter-finals
Leland S. (USA)	0
Kojima W. (JPN)	2
Minato K. (JPN)	1
Kohei U. (JPN)	2
Shunsei K. (JPN)	0
Pietro Nihal K. (ITA)	2
Kanata S. (JPN)	1
Sora E. (JPN)	2

Semi-finals
Kojima W. (JPN)	0
Kohei U. (JPN)	2
Pietro Nihal K. (ITA)	0
Sora E. (JPN)	2

Final
Kohei U. (JPN)	0
Sora E. (JPN)	2

=== Seniors ===
The Top 74 Pokémon Scarlet and Violet players born between 2007 and 2010 were invited and competed in a Swiss-system format to determine the Top 8 knockout stage.

Quarter-finals
Teddy F. (UK)	0
Yuta K. (JPN)	2
Sali R. (ITA)	1
Tomoya O. (JPN)	2
Aidan P. (USA)	0
Yuta O. (JPN)	2
Robbie S. (NED)	2
Tomoya Z. (JPN)	0

Semi-finals
Yuta K. (JPN)	0
Tomoya O. (JPN)	2
Yuta O. (JPN)	0
Robbie S. (NED)	2

Final
Tomoya O. (JPN)	2
Robbie S. (NED)	0

=== Masters ===
The Masters division featured 113 Pokémon Scarlet and Violet players born in 2006 or earlier. The bracket below shows the quarterfinals onward rather than the entire knockout stage.

Germany's Michael Kelsch reached the final during his first season competing in the VGC format, after previously playing competitive single battles. His team included Farigiraf, whose ability to block priority moves he used to protect Dragapult.

Quarter-finals
Federico Camporesi (ITA)	2
Abdullah Mohayyuddin (CAN)	0
Michael Kelsch (GER)	2
Nikolaj Høj Nielsen (DEN)	0
Victor Medina (ESP)	1
Mao Harada (JPN)	2
Shohei Kimura (JPN)	2
Mattie Morgan (IRL)	0

Semi-finals
Federico Camporesi (ITA)	0
Michael Kelsch (GER)	2
Mao Harada (JPN)	0
Shohei Kimura (JPN)	2

Final
Michael Kelsch (GER)	0
Shohei Kimura (JPN)	2

== Pokémon Unite ==
=== Group stage ===
The top 28 Pokémon Unite teams (of five people) were invited and competed in a group stage format to determine the Top 8 knockout stage. The winners of each group advance to the Top 8 knockout stage.

Group	Winners	Runners-up	Third place	Fourth place
A	Perú	Hoenn	Team3Stars	Secret Ship
B	Orangutan	Rex Regum Qeon	Nouns Esports	EXO Clan
C	00 Nation	Talibobo Believers	iClen	
D	Akjil	Amaterasu	Rise Gaming	Fusion
E	Mjk	TeamMYS	Team Peps	TTV
F	OMO Abyssinian	Team YT	UD Vessuwan	
G	Luminosity Gaming	TimeToShine	S8UL Esports	
H	Oyasumi Makuro	Kumu	Entity7	

=== Knockout stage ===
Upper round 1	Upper round 2	Upper final	Final
Perú	1
Oyasumi Makuro	2
Oyasumi Makuro	2
Mjk	1
Akjil	0
Mjk	2
Oyasumi Makuro	0
Luminosity Gaming	2
Orangutan	0
Luminosity Gaming	2
Luminosity Gaming	2
OMO Abyssinian	0
00 Nation	1
OMO Abyssinian	2	Luminosity Gaming	3
OMO Abyssinian	0
Lower round 1	Lower round 2	Lower round 3	Lower final
OMO Abyssinian	2
Perú	0	Akjil	0	Oyasumi Makuro	1
Akjil	2	OMO Abyssinian	2	OMO Abyssinian	2
Mjk	1
Mjk	2
Orangutan	1	00 Nation	0
00 Nation	2
