= Pokémon Unite =

2021 video game

- Developer: TiMi Studio Group
- Publishers: WW: The Pokémon Company; CN: Tencent Games
- Producer: Yuki Gabe
- Composer: Shota Kageyama
- Series: Pokémon
- Engine: Unity
- Platforms: Android iOS; Nintendo Switch (Note: Global server only)
- Release: Nintendo Switch; WW: 21 July 2021; Android, iOS; WW: 22 September 2021; CN: 7 November 2024
- Genres: Multiplayer online battle arena, real-time strategy
- Mode: Multiplayer

Pokémon Unite (stylized as Pokémon UNITE) is a 2021 free-to-play multiplayer online battle arena video game developed by TiMi Studio Group and published by The Pokémon Company worldwide and by Tencent Games in China for Android, iOS, and Nintendo Switch. It was announced in a Pokémon Presents presentation on 24 June 2020 as a partnership between The Pokémon Company and TiMi Studio Group owner Tencent Games. The game was released for the Nintendo Switch on 21 July 2021, and for Android and iOS in 73 countries on 22 September 2021. As of July 2024, the game has been downloaded over 200 million times across all platforms. The game was shut down in Belgium and the Netherlands on 30 November 2025. The game will shut down in China on 28 January 2027, and in all regions on 23 March 2027.

== Gameplay ==
Gameplay screenshot of a player-controlled Absol attacking wild Pokémon

Pokémon Unite is a multiplayer online battle arena game in the manner of TiMi's previous title Honor of Kings, with standard matches consisting of two teams, each with 5 players. Each match is limited to 10 minutes in duration, and the team with the highest total score by the end of each match wins. If there is a tie, the team that reached the final score first (i.e. was previously leading in points) wins. A team can also win if the opposing team surrenders, which can only occur once the match reaches the halfway mark, and only if a supermajority of one team votes to surrender. There are limited time events with special rules, and a game mode called Quick Battle, 5 minute matches on smaller maps with 3-4 players per team and some changes to the rules.

Each player starts a match controlling a relatively weak Pokémon. The Pokémon may become stronger and gain access to new "moves" by capturing wild Pokémon, helping defeat wild Pokémon that their teammate captures, scoring a goal (with the amount of Experience gained varying depending on the number of points scored) and knocking out enemy player Pokémon. The "type" system common in other Pokémon games, a system similar to rock paper scissors that determines each Pokémon's effectiveness against others, is absent from Pokémon Unite. However, the game includes a new mechanic to the series known as "Unite Moves", which are moves similar to Ultimate moves in other MOBAs, and are unique to each Pokémon and are unlocked at certain levels depending on the Pokémon. Currently, the game has over 79 playable Pokémon.

Aside from the gameplay, Pokémon Unite differs from other MOBAs by lacking an in-game scoreboard, to discourage players from leaving the game out of frustration when they are losing in score; instead, the current score is implied through announcements at specific times of the match, specifically at 5 minutes to the end of the match, 3 minutes to the end of the match, two minutes before the end of the match and one minute before the end of the match. For instance, if the "We have a huge lead!" announcement is played, it means that one's own team is leading the score by 100 points or more, while if the "We're REALLY struggling!" announcement is played, it means that one's own team is trailing by 100 points or more.

== Development ==
TiMi Studios Group, a Chinese video game developer and subsidiary of Tencent Games, began a closed beta test for Pokémon Unite in January 2021. This test was limited to select players in China. In February 2021, The Pokémon Company announced that another closed beta test would be scheduled for March 2021, this time specifically for Canadian Android smartphone users. The reveal of Pokémon Unite was controversial, with outlets discussing the game's potential to open a new competitive gaming scene to a fresh audience. The YouTube video of the announcement quickly became the most disliked video on The Pokémon Company's YouTube channel. The Nintendo Switch version of the game, as well as the mobile versions for iOS and Android, were officially released on 21 July 2021 and 22 September 2021 respectively. TiMi Studios Group plans to continue development of the game after its official release, such as offering new playable Pokémon as downloadable content, the first of which became available for players on 28 July 2021.

In September 2024, The Pokémon Company and TiMi Studio Group announced the game would shut down in Belgium and the Netherlands on 30 November 2025. On 27 October 2026, The Pokémon Company and TiMi Studio Group announced that the game is set to shut down in China on 28 January 2027 and in all regions on 23 March 2027.

== In esports ==
In January 2022, it was officially confirmed by producer Masaaki Hoshino that the game would be part of the Pokémon World Championships taking place in August, joining the main series games (known as VGC), the TCG, Pokémon Go, and Pokkén Tournament's last Championship Series season. In a statement on the game's official website, he also stated that a tournament mode is in development, wherein the playing field would be evened for all competitors, regardless of the grade of their items. The tournament mode was eventually released on 20 January 2022. In the same month, the game was used as part of the AKB48 Group Invitational tournament, which in turn formed part of the Pokémon Battle Festival Asia online event, hosted by ESL Asia. MNL48's Team Padayon won the event after they defeated BNK48's Yummy Remote 3-1 in the Grand Finals.

For the first season of the Pokémon Unite Championship Series, there were 11 supported Regional Zones: North America, Mexico, Central America, South America-West, South America-East, Japan, South Korea, Europe, Oceania, India, and the Asia-Pacific regions. Players must be 16 or 18 to register, depending on their Regional Zone.

In each month, in the lead up to the World Championships, a series of tournaments in each Regional Zone will be held. Like other games held in the World Championships, teams will be awarded championship points (CP), and the CP can be kept by players to allow team changes as the season progresses.

The top 8 teams in CP from each Regional Zone before June qualify for a spot in the Regional Championships. The Regional Championships begin with a round-robin tournament, with teams split into four groups, before switching to a double-elimination tournament for the finals. The top performing teams in the finals qualify for the World Championships.

North American team BLVKHVND won the first Unite Championship Series title in August 2022 in London, and in August 2023, the same North American team, now competing under Luminosity Gaming, won the second Unite Championship Series in Yokohama. Japanese team Fennel became the first non-North-American team to win the Unite Championship Series, doing so in August 2024 in Honolulu, Hawaii by defeating South Korean team XoraTigersGaming with a score of 3-0. In 2025, PERÚ UNITE won the fourth Unite Championship Series in Anaheim. In 2026, ZETA DIVISION won the fifth Unite Championship Series in San Francisco after coming in second place the previous year.

== Reception ==
Reception

Aggregate scores
Aggregator	Score
Metacritic	NS: 70/100
OpenCritic	41% recommend (Note: Based on 32 reviews.)

Review scores
Publication	Score
Destructoid	7/10
Game Informer	8/10
GameSpot	7/10
Gamezebo	4/5
IGN	6/10
Nintendo Life	6/10
RPGFan	75/100
Shacknews	7/10

Pokémon Unite received "mixed or average" reviews, according to review aggregator Metacritic. IGN gave the game a 6/10, criticizing some microtransactions as enabling pay-to-win gameplay. The game's microtransactions have also been criticized for their price, specifically, one of the customizable options for one of the Pokémon, Alolan Ninetales, costing US$40. This would also happen again with a Halloween-exclusive skin for the Pokémon Lucario, as well as a Christmas-themed skin for Pikachu. In response to discussions about the game on social media amongst fans, The Pokémon Company—through the official Pokémon Unite Twitter account—promoted a survey for feedback from fans to improve the game.

By 16 September 2021, the game had been downloaded over 9 million times on the Switch, with over 7.5 million mobile pre-registrations prior to the 22 September mobile release. By 1 October, research company Sensor Tower reported that Unite has been downloaded 30 million times for mobile devices, while The Pokémon Company confirmed that the game has been downloaded over 25 million times on all platforms by 4 October. On 6 December 2021, The Pokémon Company announced that the downloads figure had reached 50 million. It was further confirmed that the game passed the 70 million downloads mark in April 2022, and 80 million by August 2022.

=== Awards ===
Pokémon Unite won awards for "Best Game" at Google Play's Best of 2021, and "Mobile Game of the Year" at the 25th Annual D.I.C.E. Awards. The game also received a nomination for "Best Mobile Game" during the 2021 Game Awards.
