= Live food =

Pet owner or zoo practice

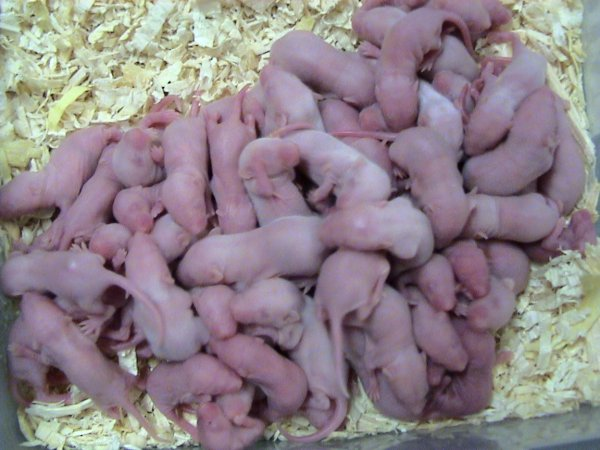
"Pinkie" mice for sale as live food for reptiles

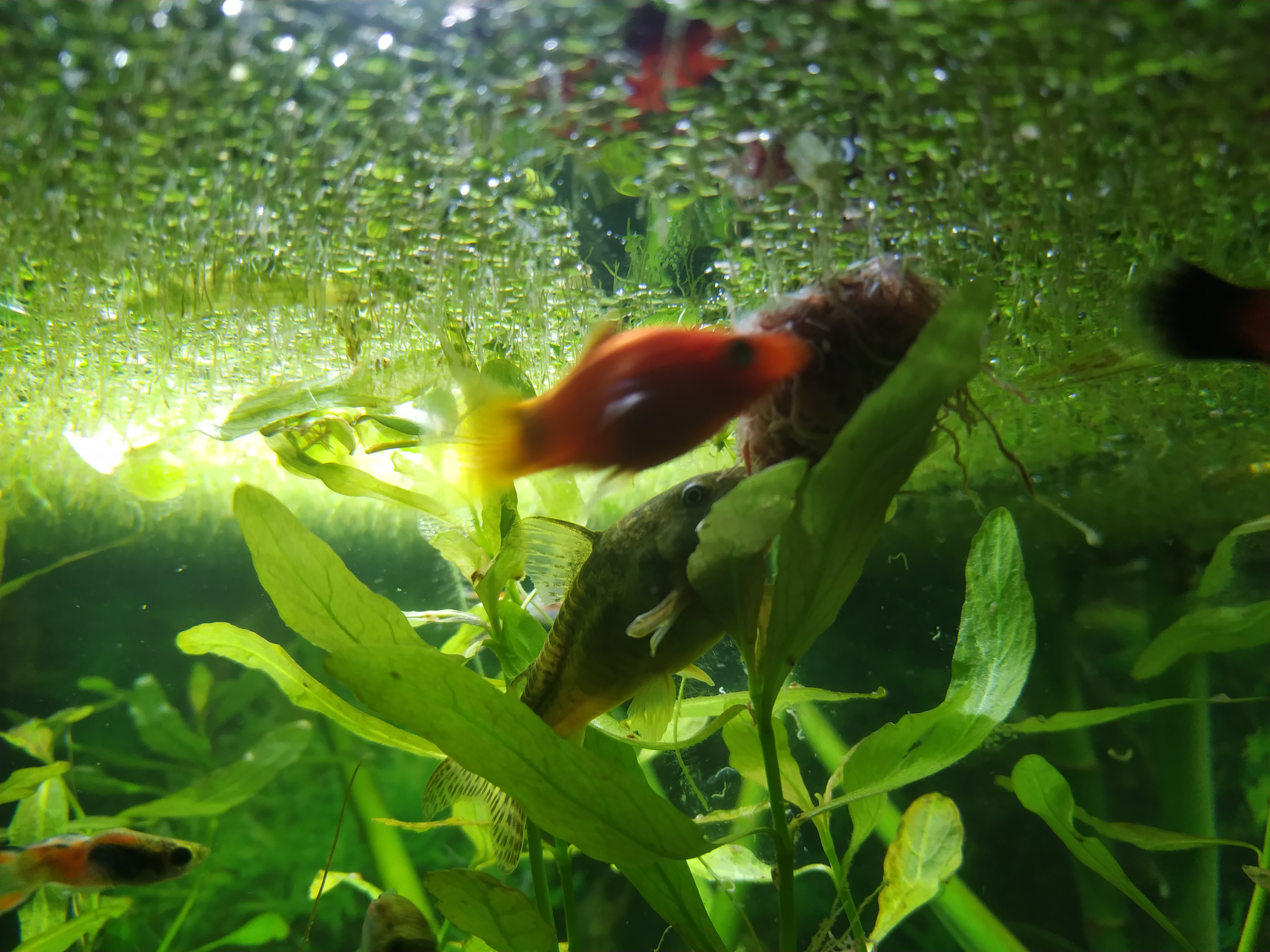
A pair of aquarium platies feeding on a ball of live Tubifex

Live food are living animals used as food for feeding other carnivorous or omnivorous animals kept in captivity; in other words, small preys that are artificially presented to larger predators kept as exotic pets, livestocks, or display animals in zoo or aquaria. The idea behind using live food is to provide lively feeds that stimulate the proactive hunting instinct in the captive animals, thus retaining their "wildness" state that is often lost in prolonged captivity.

Live food is used to feed a variety of captive animals, typically those that are naturally insectivorous, piscivorous or vermivorous, such as spiders, ornamental fish, songbirds and landfowls, small frogs and lizards. Those that are fed larger, tougher and more mobile live prey such as crustaceans, bivalves and rodents are typically hypercarnivorous predators such as mantis shrimps, octopuses, predatory fish, bullfrogs, large reptiles (e.g. crocodiles and alligators, snakes, large varanids such as Komodo dragon and monitor lizards, and snapping turtles), predatory birds and various carnivoran mammals such as great cats, canines and mustelids. Occasionally mesocarnivorous/hypocarnivorous animals such as bears and foxes, who are more generalist and less dietarily dependent on fresh meat, are also fed live food. For instance, pet skunks, who are omnivorous, can technically be fed a limited amount of live food, although this is not known to be a common practice.

Common live food are typically invertebrates, ranging from insects (both adult and larvae, for example, crickets are used as an inexpensive feed for reptiles such as bearded dragons and commonly available in pet stores for this reason; other examples are cockroaches, locusts, waxworms and mealworms), to crustaceans (e.g. crabs and crawfish), gastropod molluscs (typically land snails and slugs) and worms (e.g. earthworms and leeches). Sometimes small vertebrates are also used, such as various feeder fish, small frogs (rare), birds (e.g. chickens) and mammals (e.g. mice and rabbits), although these are more controversial in regarding to animal ethics.

In hunting and fishing, the use of live food as bait is an archaic practice that is considered unnecessary and cruel in modern times, as luring games with dead carcasses or cutlets typically works just as well. The only exception is angling, where live food such as earthworms, bait fish and crawfish are frequently presented as a live bait attached to the fishing hook to better attract game fish, although the use of imitative lures such as swimbaits, flies and plastic worms as fake live baits are gaining popularity in recreational fishing. Live worms such as Tubifex are also used as common fish food for aquaria and fish ponds.

== Varieties ==
Live foods are most commonly invertebrates, such as crickets (Gryllus assimilis, Gryllus bimaculatus, Gryllodes sigillatus and Acheta domesticus commonly), waxworms (Galleria mellonella), mealworms (Tenebrio molitor), superworms (Zophobas morio) and locusts (a number of species are seen commonly). There are however many more species used such as butter worms, calci worms (Hermetia illucens), buffalo worms, bean weevils, sun beetle grubs (Pachnoda marginata), earthworms, silkworms and more. Insect species are most commonly used to feed small reptiles and amphibians. Dubia cockroaches can be used to feed pet reptiles.

Another common form of live food, most commonly used to feed snakes, is small rodents. The most commonly known small rodent used for live food is likely the mouse; many pet stores which carry snakes or cater to snake owners also carry "feeder mice" for this reason (see Fancy mouse). It is also common to feed reptiles freshly killed or frozen/thawed rodents as most reptiles will readily accept them.

Animals that are the most common choices for live foods, ranging from feeder mice to crickets and mealworms, generally are bred and raised in captivity themselves, and can often be found both through local pet stores and from wholesalers or "farms" that breed them specifically for live food sales. Some other animals, such as guinea pigs or rabbits, are sometimes used to feed medium-sized carnivores such as pythons, small crocodilians or in rarer cases, large felids.

== Animals commonly fed live food ==
Animals that are commonly fed live food include bearded dragons, leopard geckos and other lizards, various types of snake, turtles, and carnivorous fish. Other animals, such as skunks (which are sometimes kept as pets), being omnivorous, can also eat some live food, though it is unknown how common this is in practice.

== See also ==
- Damnatio ad bestias, a type of capital punishment by feeding a human victim to carnivores
