= Aquarium fish feed =

Plant or animal material intended for consumption by pet fish

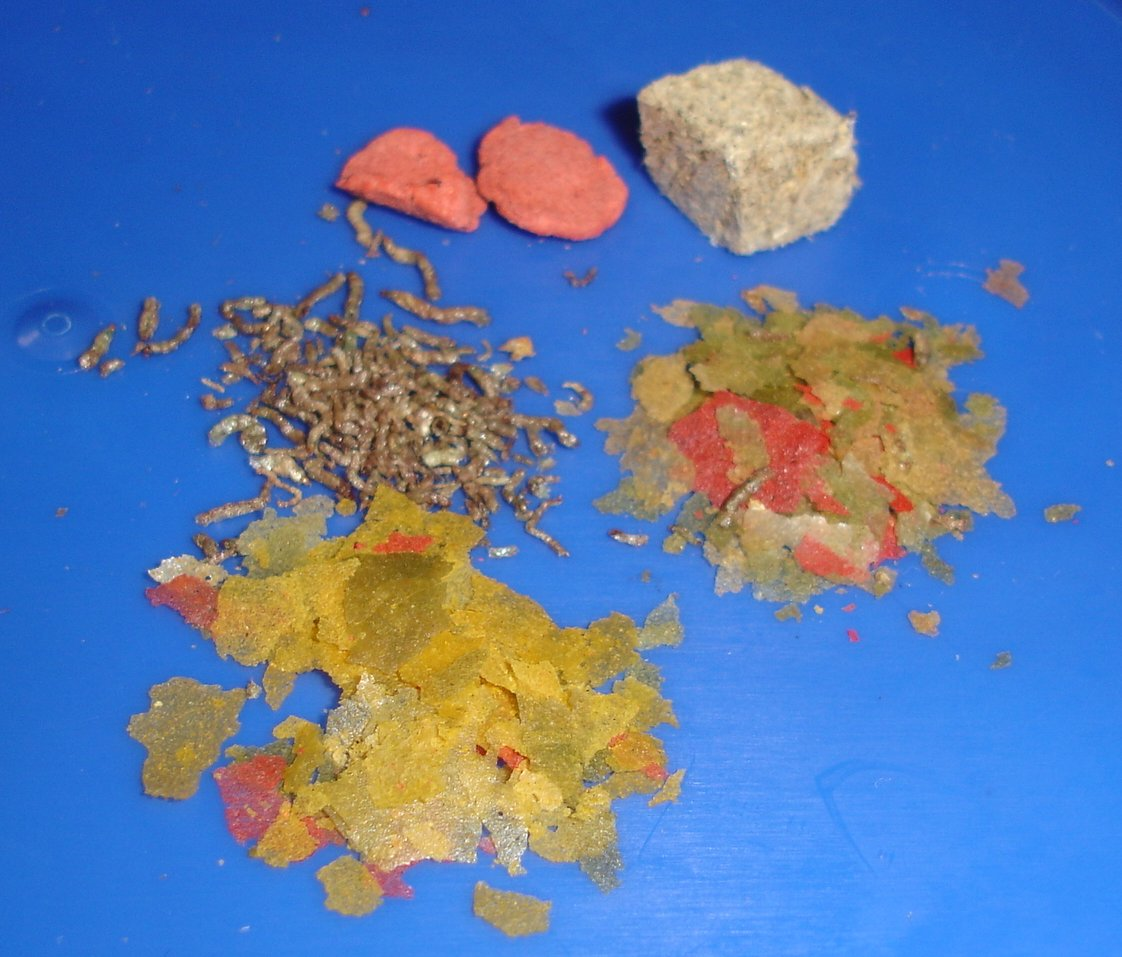
Various types of prepared dried fish food. Clockwise from top left: tablets, freeze-dried tubifex worms (pressed into a cube), two types of flake foods, and freeze-dried insect larvae.

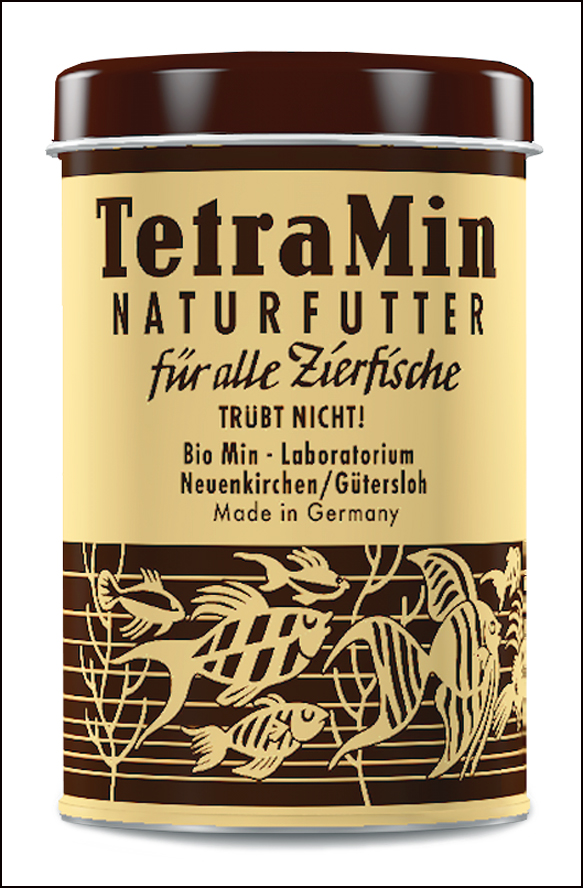
TetraMin

Aquarium fish feed is plant or animal material intended for consumption by pet fish kept in aquariums or ponds. Fish foods normally contain macronutrients, trace elements and vitamins necessary to keep captive fish in good health. Approximately 80% of fishkeeping hobbyists feed their fish exclusively prepared foods that most commonly are produced in flake, pellet or tablet form. Some fish foods also contain additives such as sex hormones or beta carotene to artificially enhance the color of ornamental fish.

== Prepared foods ==
Prepared foods are those foods that are non-living and are made by the aquarist or bought already prepared for consumption for fish.

=== Dry foods ===
Dry food is a type of proprietary or artificially manufactured fish food consumed by a wide variety of tropical and saltwater fish and invertebrates. It is ideally suited to top dwellers and mid-water fish though numerous bottom dwelling species consume flake food once it has settled on the bottom. Flake food is baked to remove moisture, ensuring a longer shelf life. Generally the more moisture a particular example of fish food contains, the more readily it will deteriorate in quality.

Dry foods are also available as pellets, sticks, flakes, tablets, granules, and wafers, manufactured to float or sink, depending on the species they are designed to feed.

=== Vacation food ===
Vacation foods, also known as "food blocks" (or "weekend blocks" for smaller versions), are designed to be placed inside the aquarium to forgo feeding while the owner is absent. These blocks release small amounts of food as they dissolve. Food blocks can be a good choice for smaller tropical fish, but can pollute the water if the tank is neglected for too long.

=== Medicated fishfood ===
Medicated fishfood is a safe and effective method to deliver medication to fish. One advantage is that medicated food does not contaminate the aquatic environment and also, unlike bath treatments, does not negatively affect fish, filtration and algae growth in the aquarium. The parasites will get treated spot on by medicated food, because the fish is ingesting it.

=== Freeze-dried and frozen fish diets ===
Freeze-dried and frozen fish foods were primarily developed for tropical and marine fish and are useful in providing variety to the diet or specialist feeding needs of some species. These include tubifex worms, mosquito larvae, bloodworms, water fleas (Daphnia and Cyclops spp.) along with brine shrimp (Artemia salina).

=== Frozen fish food ===
Perishable food can be preserved by frozen storage, and is often sold in blister packs or resealable packets. These can contain a variety of ingredients such as bloodworms, Daphnia, or brine shrimp, and are commonly used to feed such fish as Discus which require a high protein diet. Often fed on beef heart fish food within the aquaculture industry, the discus fish are not the only fish which can benefit from a high quality prepared frozen mixture such as beef heart, although by far these are the fish most associated with this particular frozen food.

== Live foods ==
Live foods are based on small living creatures in their recognizable form and can be either still living, dried or frozen. Live fish food include earthworms, sludge worms, water fleas, bloodworms, and feeder fish. Food for larvae and young fish include infusoria (Protozoa and other microorganisms), newly hatched brine shrimp and microworms. These are the most preferred type of food for fish, but are difficult to get and can be quite expensive. However, freeze dried forms of earthworms, tubifex etc. are available now.

== Ingredients ==
Fish food should ideally provide the fish with fat (for energy) and amino acids (building blocks of proteins) and the fish food (whether flake or pellet) must be speedily digested in order to prevent buildup of intestinal gas, kidney failure and infections (such as swim bladder problems and dropsy) and to avoid aquarium pollution due to excessive ammonia. Aquatic diets for carnivores must contain vegetable matter such as spirulina.

=== Nutrients ===
- Amino acids are the basic components of proteins. Protein requirements are species-specific. Carnivorous fish need a greater percentage of proteins than herbivorous. An example of an aquatic diet that is a good source of amino acid is a crumbled hard boiled egg offered to small fry. Large amounts of DL-Methionine enhance the headgrowth of the Lionhead goldfish.
- Fats that are broken down into fatty acids are the main source of energy in fish especially for the heart and skeletal muscles. Fats also assist in vitamin absorption. Vitamins A, D, E and K are fat-soluble or can only be digested, absorbed, and transported in conjunction with fats.
- Carbohydrates are molecular substances that include sugars, starches, gums and celluloses. Most of the carbohydrates that are incorporated into aquatic diets are of plant origin and are sources of the enzyme amylase. Carbohydrates, however, are not a superior energy source for fish over protein or fat but digestible carbohydrates do spare protein for tissue building. Unlike in mammals, glycogen is not a significant storage depot of energy in fish.

=== Sources ===
- Fish meal (protein source) have two basic types: (a) those produced from fishery wastes associated with the processing of fish for human consumption (such as salmon and tuna) and (b) those from specific fish (herring, menhaden and pollack) which are harvested solely for the purpose of producing fish meal.
- Shrimp mix (shrimp meal) is made from cull shrimp that are being processed before freezing or from whole shrimp that is not of suitable quality for human consumption. The material to be made into shrimp meal is dried (sun-dried or by using a dryer) and then ground. Shrimp meal is a source of pigments that enhances the desirable color in the tissues of fish. It is also a secondary supplemental protein source for fish.
- Squid meal is made from squid viscera portions from cannery plants including the eggs and testis. Squid Meal is a highly digestible protein source for fish which provides a full range of amino acids, vitamins, minerals and cholesterol (1.0–1.5%) of cholesterol suitable for fish fry and young fish.
- Brine shrimp (adult Artemia) is a common food source for fish that are available in adult-form, as eggs or freeze-dried. Brine shrimp is a source of protein, carotene (a color enhancer) and acts as a natural laxative in fish digestive systems. Brine shrimps can also supply the fish with vegetable matter due to their consumption of algae.
- Daphnia species (commonly Pulex or Moina) vary in size, but all are about 50% protein and are high in carotenoids. They can be cultivated in live cultures or freeze dried.
- Soybean meal is a high protein source for fish and has become a substitute for traditionally used marine animal meals.
- Spirulina is a blue-green Cyanobacteria rich in raw protein, vitamins A, B_{1}, B_{2}, B_{6}, B_{12}, C and E, beta-carotene, color enhancing pigments, a whole range of minerals, essential fatty acids and eight amino acids required for complete nutrition.
- Whole wheat (carbohydrates) is not the best source of energy in fish but is an excellent source of roughage for fish such as Goldfish and Koi. It is also a natural source of vitamin E which promotes growth and enhances coloration.

== See also ==
- Aquarium
- Aquarium fish feeder
- Commercial fish feed
- Hikari (fish food)
- Pet food
- Pond
- Rolf C. Hagen Group
- Tetra Company
- Wardley (company)

== Other sources ==
- "An Interpet Guide to Fancy Goldfish" by Dr. Chris Andrews – ISBN 1-902389-64-6
