= Feeder fish =

Fish used as live food for other captive animals

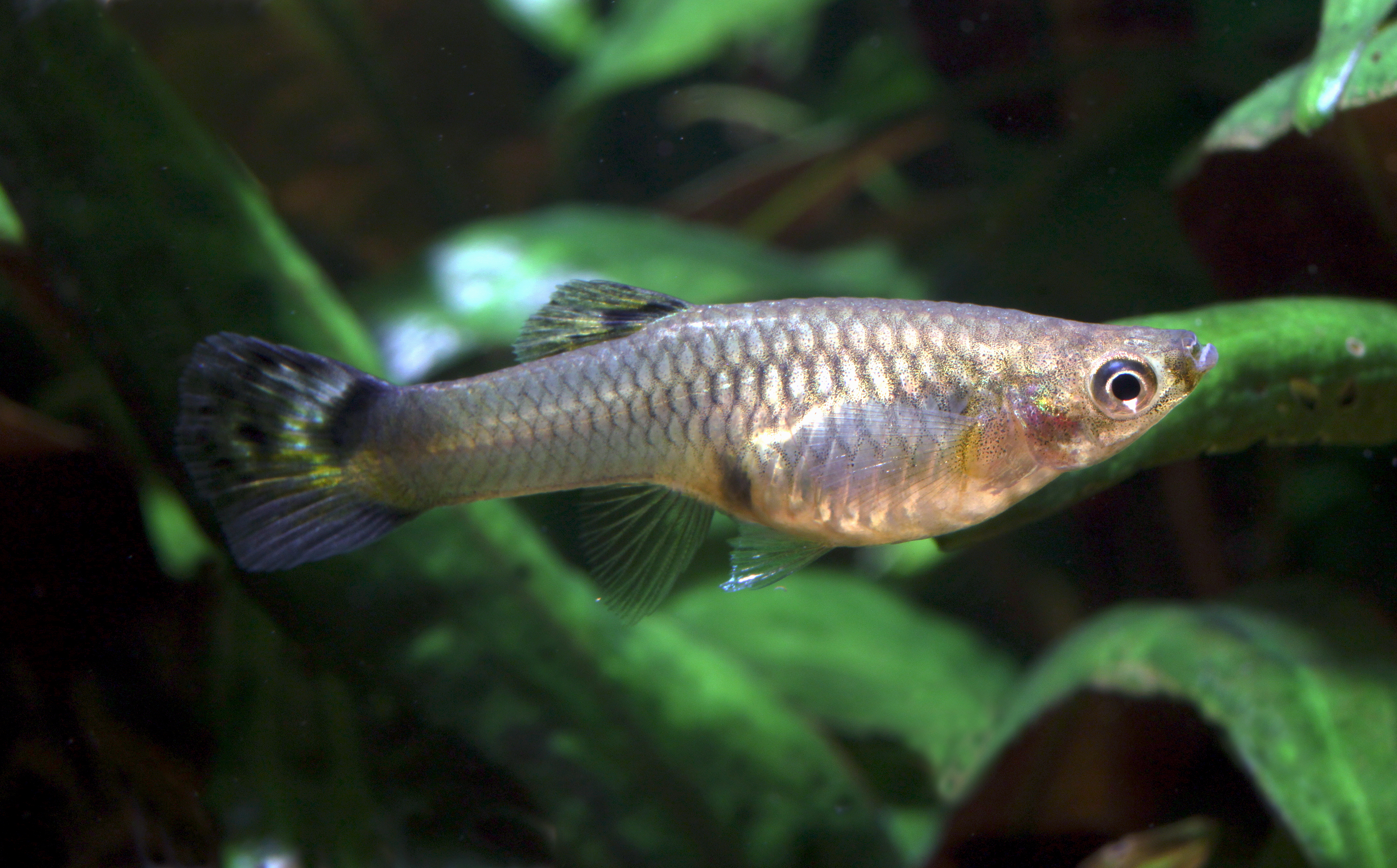
Guppies are a common example of feeder fish

Feeder fish is the common name for certain types of small, inexpensive fish commonly fed as live food to other captive animals such as predatory fishes (e.g. aquarium sharks, farmed salmon and tuna) or carnivorous aquarium fish (e.g. oscars, gar, grouper and rays), turtles, crocodilians and other piscivores that naturally hunt in fresh, brackish or salt water ecosystems (zoo animals such as grizzlies, water snakes, cetaceans, pinnipeds and penguins).

== Advantages of using feeder fish ==
The species of fish usually sold as feeder fish are invariably some of the easiest fish for fishkeepers to rear and breed, such as common goldfish, guppies and fathead minnow. Typically, these species are tolerant of overcrowding and have a high fecundity and rapid growth rate. This makes it easy for fish farmers, retailers, and hobbyists to maintain large populations of these fish that can be sold at a much more affordable price than the more ornamental fish that require better conditions.

In some cases, species of predatory animals, typically large fish such as catfish, european perch and cichlids, but sometimes also animals such as freshwater turtles, are provided with feeder fish, because they accept them more readily than alternatives. Other animal keepers believe that feeder fish are particularly nutritious, being what one would expect their pets would eat in the wild; some others view feeder fish as a stimulating treat that encourages predatory animals to exercise their natural hunting behaviours. Some animal keepers enjoy watching the hunting and eating techniques involved when predation occurs.

== Disadvantages of using feeder fish ==
The primary drawback of feeding live fish is the possibility of contaminating the aquarium with bacteria and parasites. The inexpensive fish that are most likely to be used as feeders have almost always been reared extensively, which means they have been exposed to various pathogens. Feeder fish can, over time, expose predatory fish to skin and gill lice, parasitic intestinal worms, neonatal tetra illness, and a wide range of opportunistic parasites, germs, and viruses. Especially whitespot and velvet which is easy to spread between feeder fish if kept in an overcrowded tank. Most predatory species that eat live fish can also be weaned onto dead alternatives. Some of the species used as feeder fish (goldfish and rosy red minnows) contain high quantities of thiaminase, an enzyme that destroys thiamine (vitamin B_{1}) and when fed in large quantities can cause nutritional imbalances. When bred and held in an overcrowded or otherwise sub-optimal environment, they may also carry bacterial infections and parasites, which can be passed along to fish that consume them. According to Jessica from " Thiamine Deficiency & fish ". Many products have been called back from the market because they contain thiamine. If a deficiency is detected, many neurological disorders can start forming Thiamine deficiency has been associated with early life-stage death, neurological issues, crippling morbidities, and significant population losses of predatory fish. Since it was first discovered, chronic thiamine deficiency has been linked to fish species kept in aquariums.

== Species use ==
Several fast-growing and hardy species are commonly sold and used as feeder fish. Depending on the locality, feeder fish may include:

- Low-quality, common livebearers, usually guppies, mosquito fish and platies
- Small cyprinids, particularly rosy red minnows and goldfish
- Undesirable livebearer and cichlid fry
- Female Siamese fighting fish
- Young tilapia
- Defective fry

== Opinions within the hobby ==
Although the use of feeder fish is fairly common in the United States, in the United Kingdom it is much less commonplace, with aquarists and hobby magazines in Britain generally rejecting the use of feeder fish as being unnecessary and likely to cause health problems.

== See also ==
- Aquarium fish feeder
- Forage fish
- Bait fish
