= Îles Sous le Vent =

Îles Sous-le-Vent may refer to

- Leeward Islands, in the Caribbean
- Leeward Islands (Society Islands), in the southern Pacific Ocean

== See also ==
- Leeward Islands (disambiguation)
