= Windward Islands (disambiguation) =

Windward Islands are the southern islands of the Lesser Antilles in the Caribbean.

Windward Islands may also refer to:

== Places ==
- Windward Islands (Society Islands), in French Polynesia in the South Pacific Ocean
- Barlavento Islands, Cape Verde

== Other uses ==
- 45637 Leeward Islands, a British LMS Jubilee Class locomotive

== See also ==
- Windward (disambiguation)
- Leeward Islands (disambiguation)
- Hawaiian Windward Islands, the main islands of the Hawaiian Islands
- SSS islands, or Dutch Windward Islands, three islands in the Lesser Antilles: Sint Maarten, Sint Eustatius, and Saba
