= Mickey Finn (fly) =

Fly fishing pattern

- Artificial fly
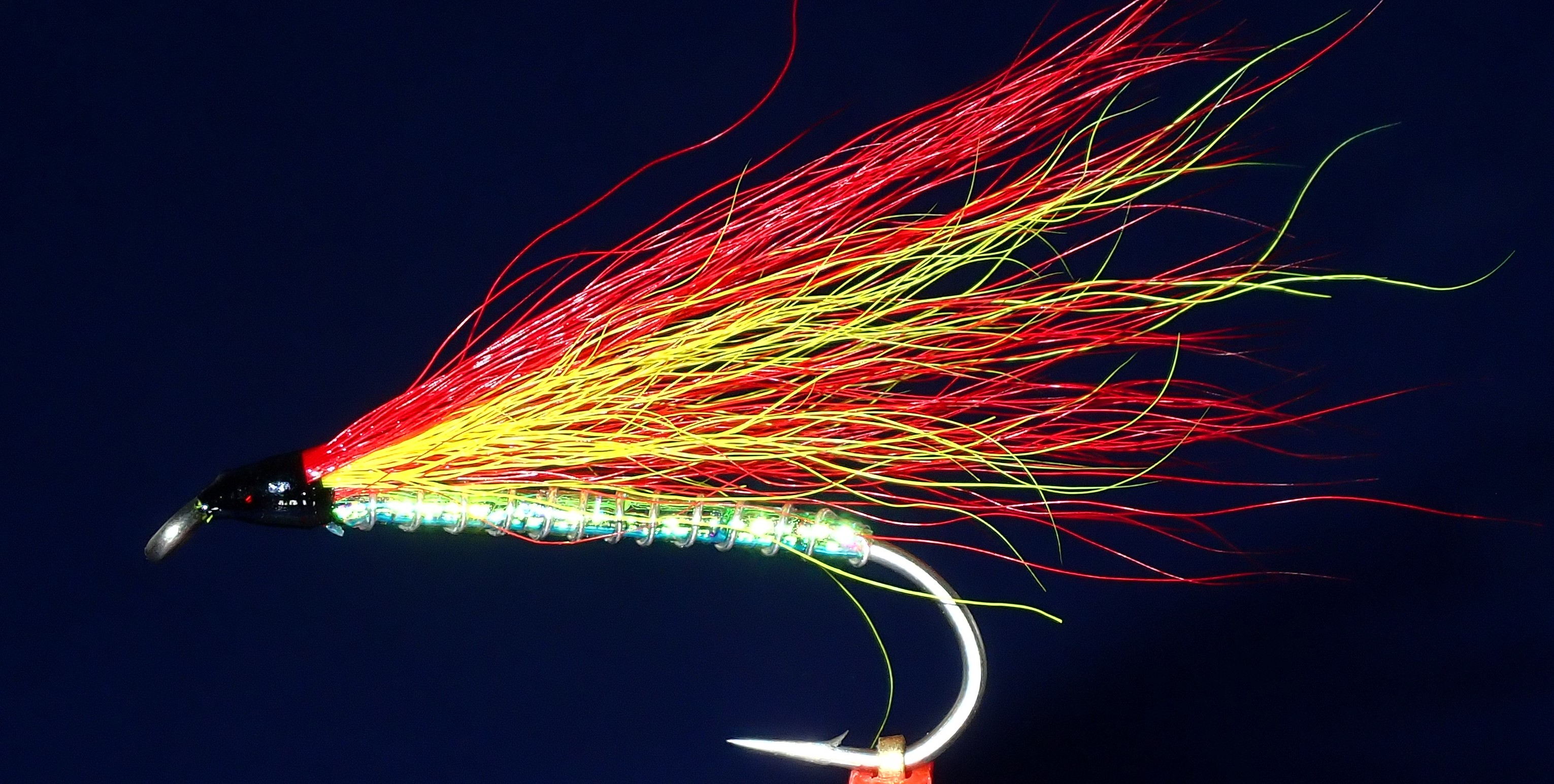
- Mickey Finn (1937)
- Type: Streamer
- Imitates: Baitfish

History
- Creator: John Alden Knight
- Created: 1937
- Other names: Red and Yellow Bucktail, Assassin

Materials
- Typical sizes: 2/0-8 4X standard streamer hook
- Typical hooks: TMC 9395, Firehole 811
- Thread: Black 6/0
- Body: Silver tinsel or mylar
- Wing: Red and Yellow bucktail
- Ribbing: Silver oval tinsel or wire
- Head: Black

Uses
- Primary use: Trout, Saltwater and freshwater species

The Mickey Finn is a historic and effective bucktail streamer used by fly anglers for trout, warm-water and saltwater species. The fly is somewhat generic and imitates a wide variety of baitfish. Although most likely originated in the late 19th century by Eastern Canadian anglers, the Mickey Finn pattern once known as the Red and yellow bucktail was popularized by angler and author John Alden Knight in 1937.

In The History of Fly Fishing in Fifty Flies (2015), Ian Whitelaw writes:

In 1937 Knight wrote and article about the fly in Hunting and Fishing that fired the popular imagination. Its publication coincided with the Sportsmen’s Show in New York, and it was estimated that as many as a half a million Mickey Finns were tied and sold during the show. The manufacturers, the Weber Lifelike Fly Company of Wisconsin, who had advertised the fly in the same magazine, were overwhelmed by orders for Mickey Finns from across the country.

— Ian Whitelaw (2015)

== Origin ==
The Mickey Finn originated in Eastern Canada in the late 19th century and was known as the Red and Yellow Bucktail. In Streamer Fly Tying and Fishing (1950), Joseph D. Bates Jr. relates the story of the Mickey Finn.

This fly was an unnamed and relatively unknown patter until Mr. John Alden Knight, angler and author of Williamsport, Pennsylvania, popularized it in his writings. The story of its introduction is quoted from letters to the author from the principles. Mr. Knight says "In the spring of 1932, when I was living in Rye, New York, I was invited to fish the waters of a trout club a short distance out of Greenwich. My host, Junior Vanderhoff, gave me a small bucktail which he had found most effective for catching stocked squaretail trout from this little stream (the Mianus River). It delivered the goods that day; in fact, it was the only fly that did."

"I learned from Mr. Vanderhoff that this fly was one of a series of small bucktails in various color combinations which were at one-time put out by William Mills and Son. Then, the fly was known only as the Red and Yellow bucktail. I used the fly for a couple of year quite successfully."

— Joseph D. Bates (1950)

John Alden Knight went on to explain the naming of the Mickey Finn:

“On the way home we christened the fly Assassin. Later that year it was rechristened by Gregory Clark, noted feature writer and war correspondent who was with the Toronto Star. He called it the Mickey Finn.” ... Mr. Gregory Clark mentioned by Mr. Knight in the letter above adds this: “A day or two after I named the fly The Assassin I recollected a story that recently had been published in Esquire Magazine about how Rudolph Valentino had been killed by Mickey Finns administered to him by the resentful waiter of New York and Hollywood and I rechristened the fly the Mickey Finn. All we did up here was to make it respectable and legitimate and to give the nameless waif an honest name.”

— Joseph D. Bates (1950)

== Imitates ==
The Mickey Finn is an attractor style streamer that imitates no particular baitfish. Depending on it size it is suggestive of a wide variety of baitfish commonly found in both freshwater and saltwater environments.

== Materials ==
- Hook: 4X Streamer 2/0-8
- Thread: Black 6/0
- Body: Silver tinsel or mylar
- Rib: Silver oval tinsel or wire
- Wing: Red and yellow bucktail
- Head: Black

== Variations ==
- Mickey Finn Marabou
- Mickey Finn Synthetic
- Mickey Finn Jungle Cock
Mickey Finn Streamers
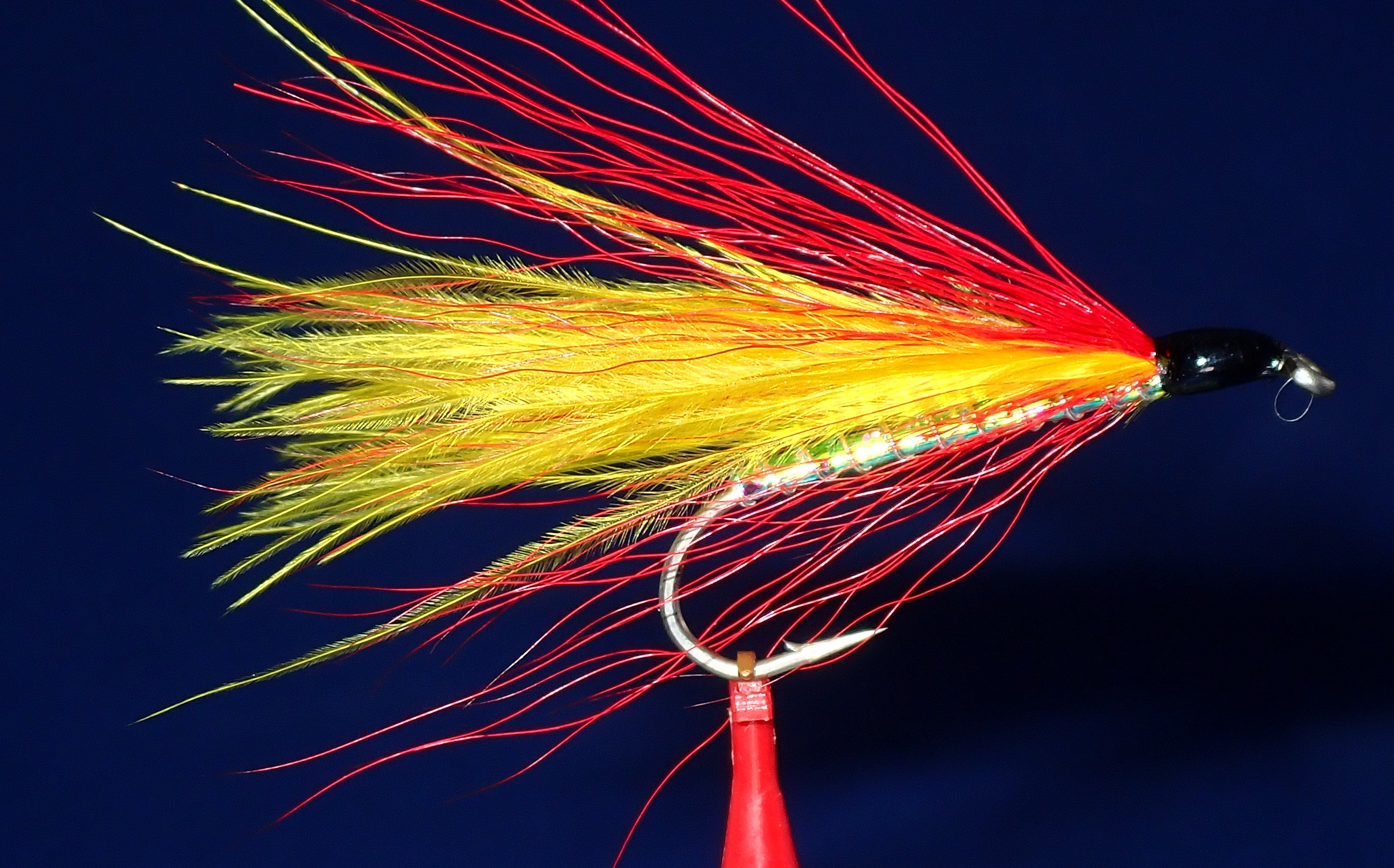
Mickey Finn Marabou

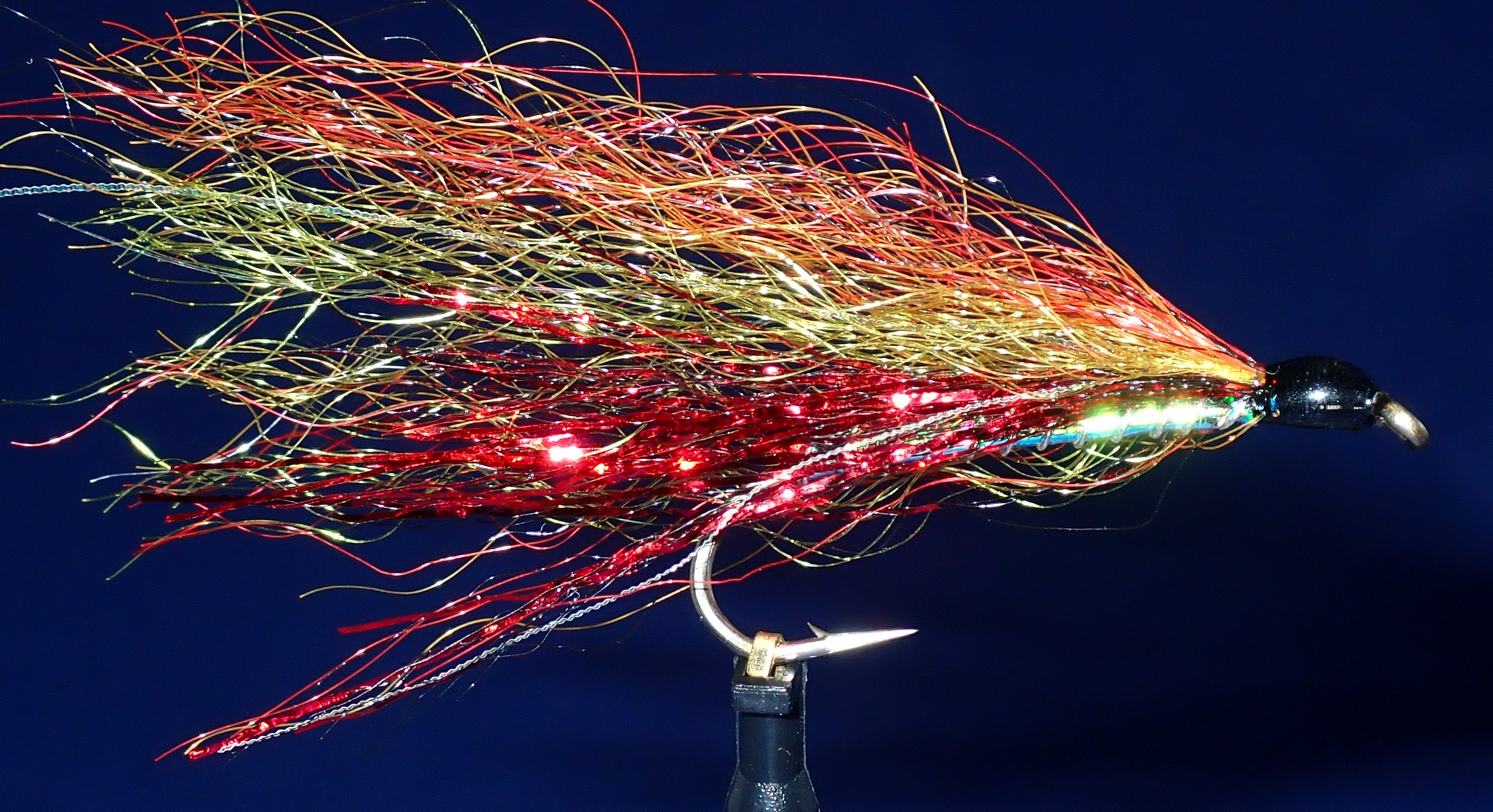
Mickey Finn Synthetic
