= Leeward (disambiguation) =

Leeward is the opposite of Windward.

Leeward may also refer to:

== Places ==
- Leeward Islands (disambiguation)
- Leeward Antilles, a chain of islands in the Caribbean
- Leeward Community College, Hawaii
- Leeward Passage
- Leeward Point Field, airfield at Guantanamo

== Other uses ==
- Leewards Creative Crafts, a defunct store
- Jimmy Leeward, pilot
- Leeward 16, an American sailboat design

== See also ==
- Lee Ward, Canadian academic
- Wardley (disambiguation)
