= ZebraBox =

The ZebraBox is an automated analysis chamber for the non-intrusive video observation of different types of freshwater marine indicator species, such as Dania rerio and Pimephales promelas. It is a type of Larval Photomoter Response (LPR) assay, which is used to monitor the swimming behaviour of larvae.

The ZebraBox contains a controlled enclosed system of 96-well plates containing a high-resolution camera fitted with an infrared light and a fixed-angle lens. The lighting conditions and illumination patterns can be manually controlled for fish acclimation and the simulation of circadian rhythms. The apparatus allows for the analysis of zebrafish locomotion and activity, thus it is used in the fields of drug discovery and toxicological studies.
