= Aquarium fish feeder =

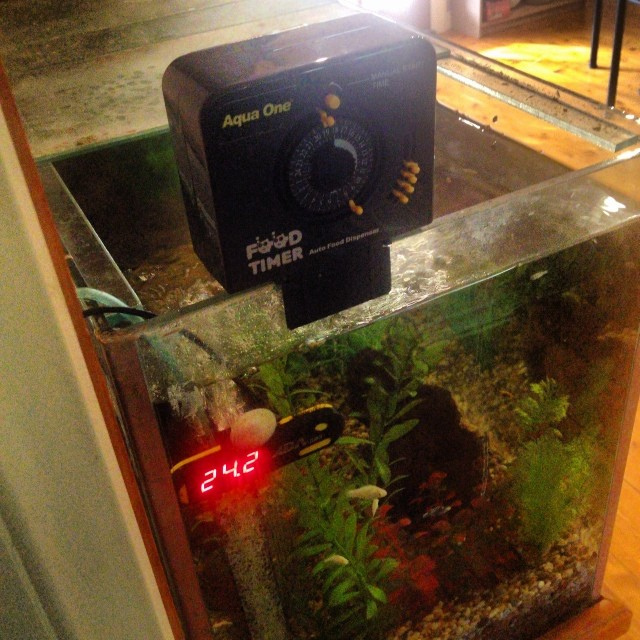
An aquarium with a fish feeder

Aquarium fish feeders are electric or electronic devices that are designed to feed aquarium fish at regular intervals. They are often used to feed fish when the aquarist is on vacation or is too busy to maintain a regular feeding schedule.

== Design ==
Fish feeders are usually clamped to the wall of the tank just over the water. Most designs consist of a hopper which is loaded with a variety of dry food, a timer which rotates the hopper at regular intervals (dispensing food in the process), and a method of setting the interval between feeding and the amount of food dispensed. Some designs have individual small hoppers. Whilst this limits the absolute number of feeds, it does allow for more accurate dosing, and delivery of mixed, (both flake and pellet), foodstuffs, which are often important for community tanks.

Most feeders can dispense flake, pellet, or freeze dried food.

== Benefits ==
The benefits of electronic aquarium feeders are not only that the fish are fed when the aquarist is not at home, but they are also helpful in maintaining the fish' health. Because they are feeding small portions of food at scheduled intervals and precise feedings at appropriate times, the automatic feeders can be successfully used to feed diabetic fish.

Another concern of aquarists is overeating. Fish are not to be given too much food. It is estimated that fish should be given as much as they can eat in 3 to 5 minutes, and once a day. However, the electronic fish feeders prevent overeating by releasing the right quantity of food, at scheduled times. This way, aquarists who have to get away for few days do not have to ask their neighbours or friends to come over and take care of their pets. It is often impossible to find a reliable person available and willing to do such a favor. The electronic fish feeders are therefore a solution for fish keepers who own aquariums and which ensure that the pets are fed in a healthy way and on schedule. There are multiple chambers within the electronic fish feeder when the feeder rotates (clockwise); the food is released at a set time. With the help of the feeder, feeding mixed food to the fish, including fish flakes and fish pellets, becomes more manageable. The mounting system is typically in the form of hooks or brackets. However, some electronic fish feeders also come with suction cups that attach to the wall of the aquarium.

Another advantage of these devices is that electronic fish feeders may also be used to feed amphibians, if they are kept in glass cages.

There are also disadvantages that come with the electronic feeders. First, fish tend to get used to where and when the timer is going to trigger and food is going to fall which can create a feeding frenzy when the feeder drops the food. This usually results in a lot of splashing which may wet the rest of the food. Mold can then grow and the leftover food is likely to go bad or to clog the feeder's mechanism. The humidity and moisture due to close proximity to the water can also cause this type of problem with an electronic feeder. Second, one has to make sure that the food containers are properly sealed and the food is kept fresh. At this time electronic feeders are not able to adjust to the changing needs of the fish over longer periods which may result in either overfeeding or underfeeding. Too much food in the water is not only bad for the fish, but also for their environment.

== Maintenance ==
The maintenance of electronic aquarium feeders basically consists in keeping the device clean and making sure the electronic part of the feeder does not get wet, which may cause improper functioning.

== Limitations ==
Though some feeders are designed specifically to keep food dry, many designs allow moisture to seep into the food hopper. This can cause clumping, and can result in the failure of the mechanism. Because fish feeders generally cannot feed frozen or live food, they are not effective options for feeding most predatory fish. Similarly, most (though not all), designs of feeder only allow for one type of food at a time, (flaked or granular), therefor fish communities requiring both floating and sinking foodstuffs are not well served, and may require two feeders.

== See also ==
- Fish food
- Fishkeeping
