= Infusoria =

Microorganisms in freshwater ponds

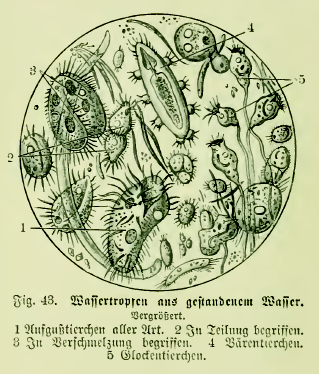
Illustration of a water drop from stagnant water

Infusoria is a word used to describe various freshwater microorganisms, including ciliates, copepods, euglenoids, planktonic crustaceans, protozoa, unicellular algae and small invertebrates. Some authors (e.g., Bütschli) have used the term as a synonym for Ciliophora. In modern, formal classifications, the term is considered obsolete; the microorganisms previously and colloquially referred to as Infusoria are mostly assigned to the clades Diaphoretickes (e.g. ciliates, most algae), Amorphea (e.g. crustaceans and other small animals) and Discoba (euglenids).

In other contexts, the term is used to define various aquatic microorganisms found in decomposing matter.

== Aquarium use ==
Certain microorganisms, including Cyclops and Daphnia (among others), are sold as a supplemental fish food. Some fish stores or pet shops may have these infusoria available for live purchase, but typically they are sold in frozen cubes—for example, by the Japan-based fish food brand Hikari. Still, some advanced aquarists, with especially large collections of fish, will breed and cultivate their own supplies of the microorganisms.

Infusoria are especially used by aquarists and fish breeders to feed fish fry; because of their small sizes, infusoria can be used to rear newly-hatched offspring of many common (and also less common) aquarium species. Many average home aquaria are unable to naturally supply sufficient infusoria for fish-rearing, so hobbyists may create and maintain their own cultures, either through utilizing their own existing aquarium water or by using one of the many commercial cultures available.

Infusoria can be cultured at-home by soaking any decomposing vegetative matter, such as papaya or cucumber peels, in a jar of aged (i.e., chlorine-free) water, preferably from an existing aquarium setup. The culture starts to proliferate in two to three days, depending on temperature and light received. The water first turns cloudy because of a rise in levels of bacteria, but clears up once the infusoria consume them. At this point, the infusoria are usually visible to the naked eye as small, white motile specks. They can be easily fed to fish with the use of a large turkey-baster or by gently scooping with a very fine net. Additionally, the water in which the infusoria are kept in can be changed periodically, even one to two times per week, by draining and replacing up to 50% of the volume of water (for hygienic and maintenance purposes).

== See also ==
- Animalcules

== Bibliography ==
- Ratcliff, Marc J. (2009). The Emergence of the Systematics of Infusoria. In: The Quest for the Invisible: Microscopy in the Enlightenment. Aldershot: Ashgate.
