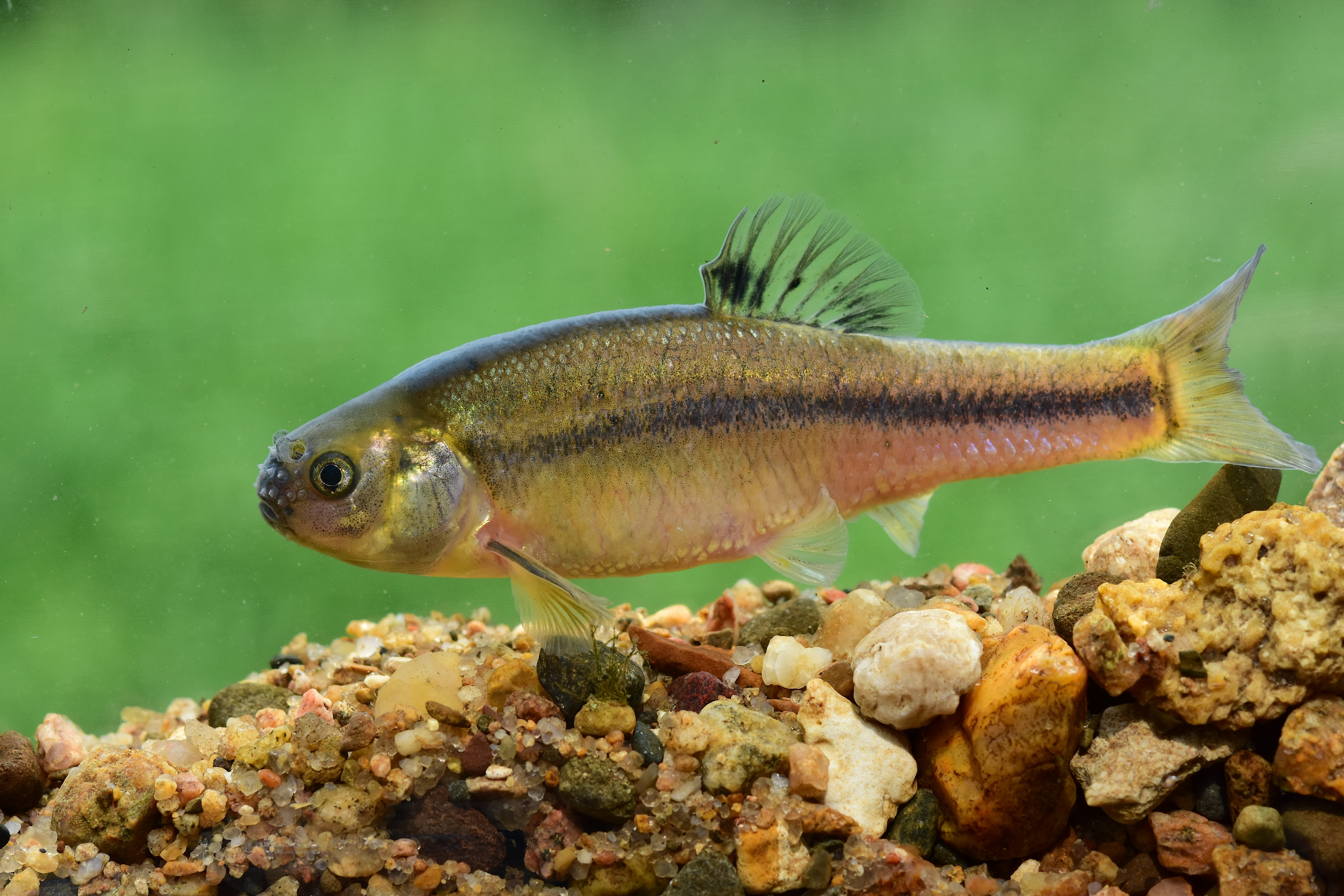

Conservation status
- Least Concern (IUCN 3.1)

Scientific classification
- Kingdom: Animalia
- Phylum: Chordata
- Class: Actinopterygii
- Order: Cypriniformes
- Family: Leuciscidae
- Subfamily: Pogonichthyinae
- Genus: Pimephales
- Species: P. promelas

Binomial name
- Pimephales promelas (Rafinesque, 1820)

Synonyms
- Hyborhynchus confertus Girard, 1856; Pimephales fasciatus Girard, 1856; Pimephales maculosus Girard, 1856; Hyborhynchus puniceus Girard, 1856; Plargyrus melanocephalus Abbott, 1860; Pimephales milesii Cope, 1865: Pimephales agassizii Cope, 1867; Coliscus parietalis Cope, 1871; Hyborhynchus nigellus Cope, 1875; Cliola smithi Evermann & Cox, 1896; Pimephales anuli Kendall, 1903; Pimephales promelas harveyensis C. L. Hubbs & Lagler, 1949

= Fathead minnow =

Species of fish

Fathead minnow (Pimephales promelas), also known as fathead or tuffy, is a species of freshwater ray-finned fish belonging to the family Leuciscidae, the shiners, daces and minnows. The natural geographic range extends throughout much of North America, from central Canada south along the Rockies to Texas, and east to Virginia and the Northeastern United States. This minnow has also been introduced to many other areas via bait bucket releases. Its golden, or xanthic, strain, known as the rosy-red minnow, is a very common feeder fish sold in the United States and Canada. This fish is also known for producing Schreckstoff (a distress signal).

== Physical description ==
The fathead minnow in its wild form is generally dull olive-grey in appearance, with a dusky stripe extending along the back and side, and a lighter belly. There is a dusky blotch midway on the dorsal fin. Breeding males acquire a large, grey fleshy growth on the nape, as well as approximately 16 white breeding tubercles on the snout.

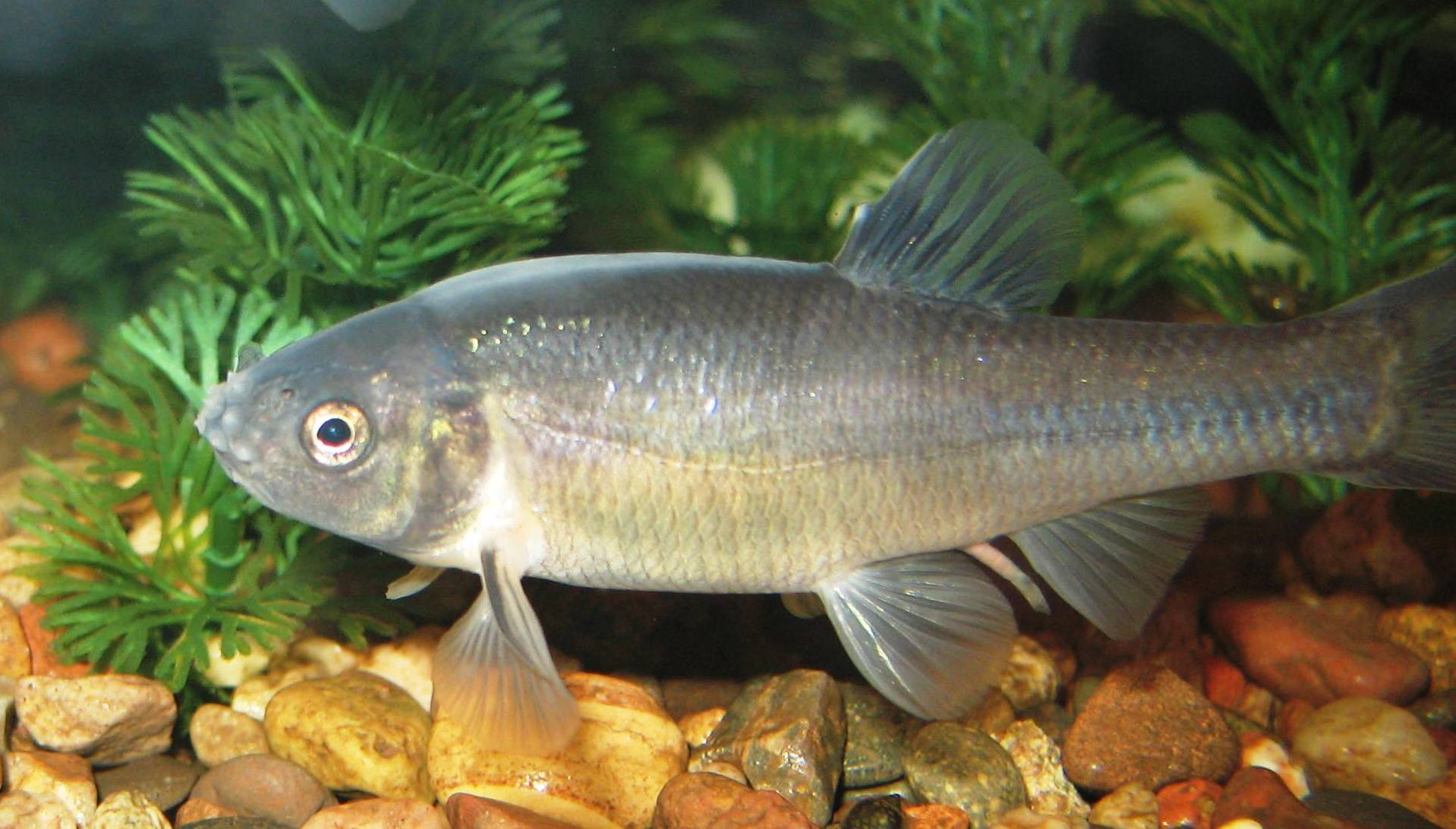
Fathead minnow (Pimephales promelas) a breeding male displaying tubercles and thickened dorsal pad of mucus-secreting cells.

Typical total lengths are between 7 and 10 cm (2.8 and 3.9 in).

== Distribution and habitat ==
Fathead minnows are distributed across North America from Chihuahua, Mexico, north to the Maritime Provinces and Great Slave Lake drainage of Canada and have been introduced to Atlantic and Pacific coastal drainage basins in the United States. Their tolerance for multiple environmental conditions, characteristics of their life history, and their popularity as bait species contribute to their widespread distribution. The fathead minnow is quite tolerant of turbid, low-oxygen water and can most commonly be found in small lakes, ponds, and wetlands. They can also be found in larger lakes, streams, and other habitats.

== Diet and predators ==
Fathead minnows are omnivores that are categorized as Benthic filter feeders, sifting through dirt and silt to find food. The carnivorous portion of their diet is made up of mainly insects, crustaceans, other aquatic invertebrates, and zooplankton. The herbivorous portion of their diet is primarily made up of algae and phytoplankton. Fathead minnows will also feed on bottom detritus.

Fathead minnows are a largely preyed upon fish that is eaten by mainly piscivorous fish such as Largemouth Bass, Northern Pike, Yellow Perch, Walleye, and various other types of fish.

== Chemical alarm signal ==
Ostariophysan fishes, which include fathead minnows, possess an alarm substance, or Schreckstoff, in distinctive epidermal club cells. The alarm substance is released upon mechanical damage to these club cells due to a predator attack, and can be detected by other ostariophysan fishes which then engage in antipredator behaviors such as hiding or dashing away. Fathead minnows learn to recognize an animal as a potential predator when it is presented in conjunction with the alarm substance. Also, alarm substance ingested by the predator will chemically label it as dangerous to naïve fathead minnows, thereby resulting in learned predator recognition. Prey fishes with chemical predator recognition abilities can inhabit areas with low visibility and more quickly detect ambush predators like the fathead minnow's primary predator, the northern pike.

== Breeding ==
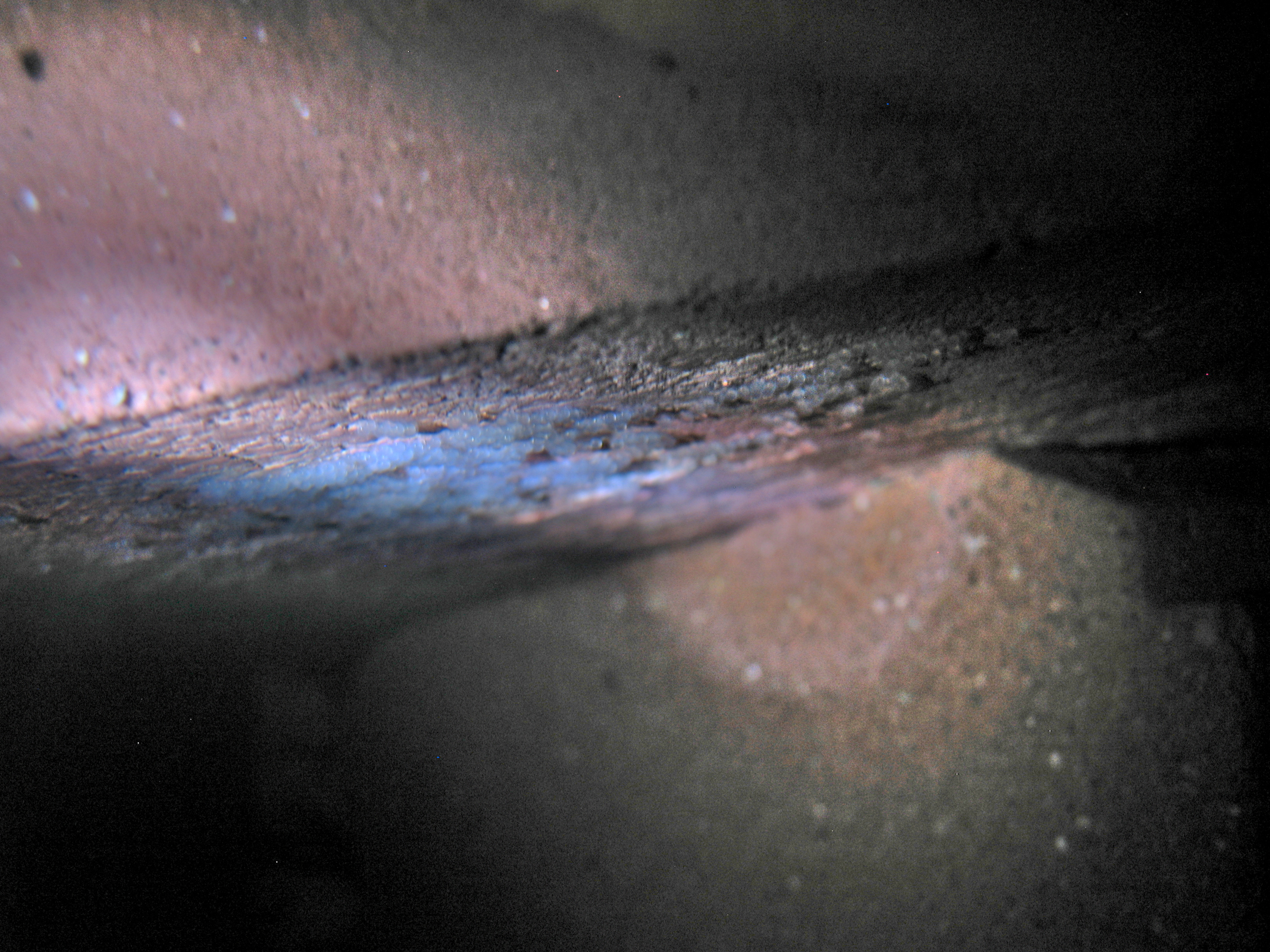
Picture of egg mass adhering to underside of a "rock cave" in a home aquarium (130 gal)

In the fathead minnow, the female supplies the eggs and the male cares for them until they hatch. The male defends a nest as females pass by and spawn eggs to be cared for by the male. In choosing a nest site, the newly reproductive male fathead minnow tends to take over the nest site of a parental male and evicting its resident rather than occupying an empty one. Also, when given the choice between different unguarded nest sites, it will usually choose the one that already contains eggs. The newer and more numerous the eggs are in the nest site, the more likely the current male is to be challenged by the newcomer. The new male will care for the old male's eggs, a behavior called allopaternal care. Paternal care of the eggs by the male includes rubbing the dorsal pad of mucus-secreting cells, which aerates the eggs and may help prevent disease; removing of diseased eggs from the clutch; and defending the clutch from egg predators, which include animals such as crayfish. This has been shown to increase the survival of the eggs, probably because the newer male is fitter and better able to protect them than the former. Egg survival and parental care behaviors also increase as the clutch size increases. Females also prefer to spawn with males that already have eggs in their nest sites, and the more the better. A male fathead minnow defends the nest site for about three to five weeks at a time, thus continual turnover of new males in the population occurs. The cost of allopaternal care is relatively small because fathead minnow eggs hatch in about five days, while the males can maintain a nest for about three to five weeks; thus, only a small proportion of the eggs that the male takes care of will ever have been adopted.

The main spawning season of the fathead minnow is from June through July, and they are in good spawning condition from mid-May to early August. In males, tubercles occur from mid-May to early August with peak development going from June to July, at the same time as other indicators of reproductive condition. In males, epidermal thickness is significantly higher between mid July and early August, but it stays constant in females. Mucous cell counts also rise in males during the breeding season, but it stays constant in females. The chemical alarm signal in the epidermal cells also drops to almost zero in males during the breeding season.

Fathead minnows are fractional spawners, meaning they begin spawning when water temperatures approach 18 °C (64 °F) and continue until they drop below that temperature in late summer. Fractional spawning can result in 16 to 26 spawning events per female and an annual fecundity of 6,800 to 10,600 eggs per female. Juveniles display rapid growth, reaching 45–50 mm (1.8–2.0 in) total length in 90 days, and most fathead minnows die after spawning by the age of one year.

Spawning can be affected by artificial estrogen, which can get from oral contraceptive pills into lakes via wastewater. Artificial estrogen feminizes male fathead minnows such that they produce vitellogenin, a protein involved in oocyte maturation, and alters oogenesis in female fathead minnows. Chronic exposure to EE, an artificial estrogen used in oral contraceptive pills, led to the collapse of the population due to reduced spawning in a seven-year whole-ecosystem study at the Experimental Lakes Area in Ontario, Canada.

== Use as aquatic toxicity indicator ==
Because the fathead minnow is fairly tolerant of harsh conditions, it can be found in bodies of water that may be uninhabitable to other fish, such as waste drainage sites. It has also been studied to investigate the effects of these waste materials on the aquatic life.

Natural and synthetic oestrogens, such as oestradiol and oestrone, are present in sewage treatment works effluents. In male fathead minnows, exposure to these steroidal compounds leads to an increase in plasma vitellogenin levels exceeding that of even mature female fathead minnows. Vitellogenin blood plasma levels are an indicator for determining if chemicals have an oestrogenic activity to fish. This is also accompanied by an inhibition of testicular growth, even if the exposure is in low concentrations or for a short period of time. These studies showed that the presence of natural oestrogens, likely originating from humans, represents a new ecotoxicological issue.

Chemical structure of bisphenol A

Bisphenol A is a chemical used to make polycarbonate plastic, epoxy resin, and other chemicals. It is also weakly estrogenic, and many of the same effects of oestradiol and oestrone can be seen with this compound. In the male fathead minnows, reduced somatic growth is seen. With females, egg production and hatchability are reduced. The effects take place more quickly in females than in males, though.

The effect of low pH on the fathead minnow has also been studied. Though survival was minimally affected by extended exposure to low pH, the minnow behavior was abnormal. They showed stress behaviors, such as surface swimming and hyperactivity. In addition, some deformities also were brought about by long exposure to low pH. In both males and females, their heads became smaller than normal. Males lose some of the brightness of their color. Females become heavy with eggs but may not spawn, and the number of eggs per female is reduced. The eggs themselves come out abnormal, fragile and lacking turgidity, and the lower the pH, the less likely the eggs are to eventually hatch.

In fathead minnows exposed to cattle feedlot effluent, the males are feminized and the females are defeminized. The male fathead minnows have reduced testicular testosterone synthesis, altered head morphometrics, and smaller testis size, while the females have a decreased estrogen:androgen ratio, which is defeminized sex hormone ratio.

== Importance to humans ==
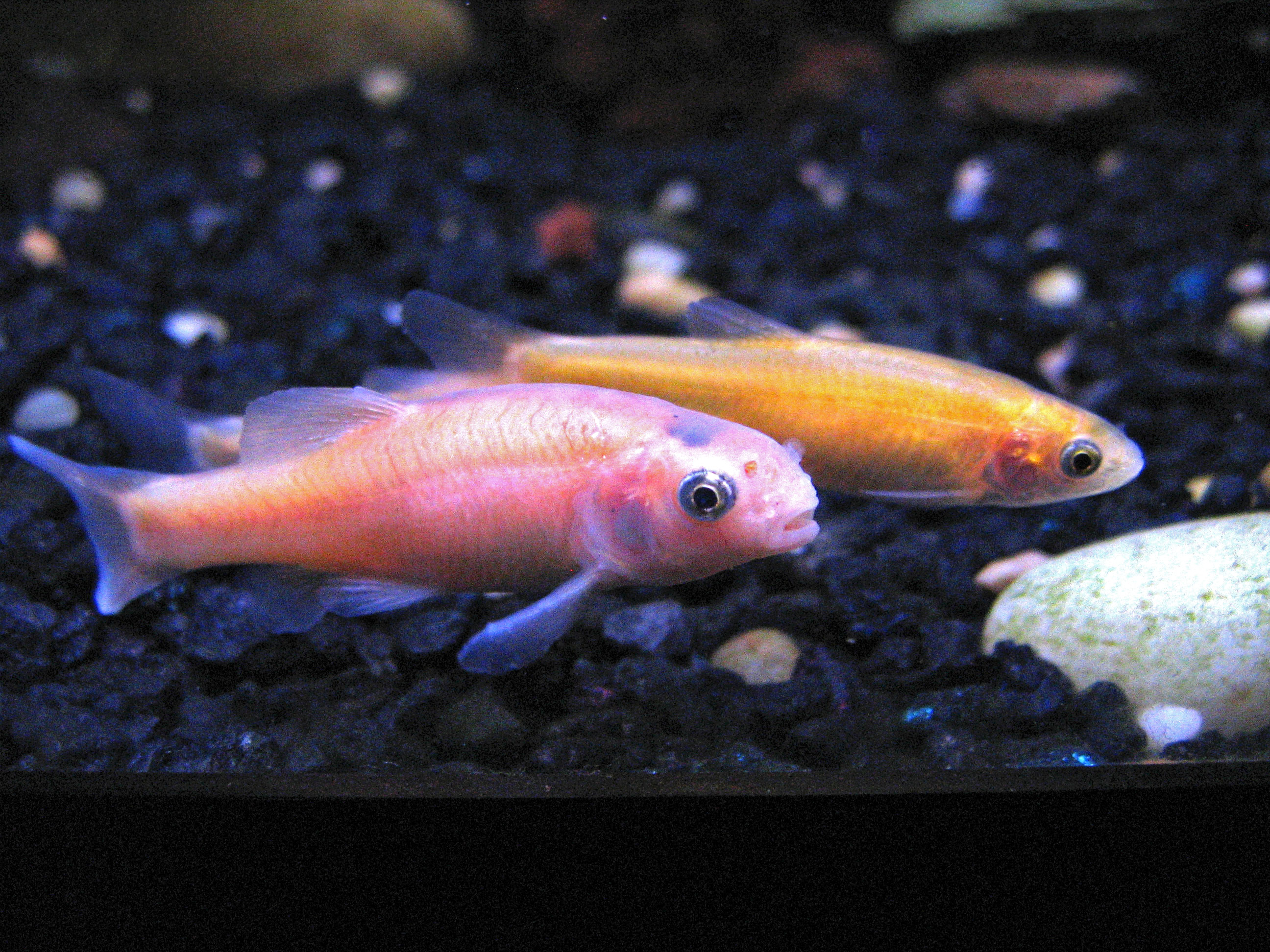
The rosy-red strain of Pimephales promelas in a home aquarium

The fathead has been very commonly used as a baitfish, and more recently has emerged in the aquarium trade as the rosy-red minnow. This colour morph was discovered in several Arkansas breeding farms in 1985. Both sexes of this strain have a rosy-golden body and fins and may express dark splotches of wild-type fathead coloration, and are sold in pet shops primarily as feeder fish. They can also be used in home aquariums as pets.

The fathead's invasive status in Europe is cited as the main cause for the spread of enteric redmouth disease among trout and eels there. Established feral populations have been found in France (in 1991), Flanders in Belgium (1995), the Netherlands (2008) and Germany (2015). A small UK population, first discovered in 2008, was declared eradicated the same year.

=== Toxicity indicator ===
This species is also important as an indicator species, a biological model in aquatic toxicology studies, similar to Ceriodaphnia dubia, Hyalella azteca, or Chironomus dilutus. Because of its relative hardiness and large number of offspring produced, EPA guidelines outline its use for the evaluation of acute and chronic toxicity of samples or chemical species in vertebrate animals.

== In the aquarium and ornamental pond ==
Generally only the rosy-red variety is sold in pet shops (though very often several wild types come in with each shipment), and is summarily the most likely to be found in an aquarium. These fish are social, active, and moderately hardy. Like most cyprinids, they will accept almost any type of food. They can be bred in an aquarium, and the fathead minnow is one of the only cyprinids that protects its eggs in the nest (carried out by the male). Fatheads will live about two years if they have spawned, but significantly longer (potentially up to four years) if they have not.

The fish can be found at many pet stores as a feeder fish under the name "rosy-red minnow". In an aquarium the fish needs to be in a school (at least 5 or 6) or it tends to be territorial but will not nip fins but instead will ram its head into other species of fish and briefly chase them.

These fish prefer a temperature of 10–21 °C (50–70 °F) and a pH range of 7.0 – 7.5.

== See also ==
- Minnow (List of all common freshwater minnows)
- List of freshwater aquarium fish species
- Robyn's Rosy Red and Fathead Minnow Page As aquarium and pond pets.
