= Comet (goldfish) =

Breed of goldfish

Comet goldfish
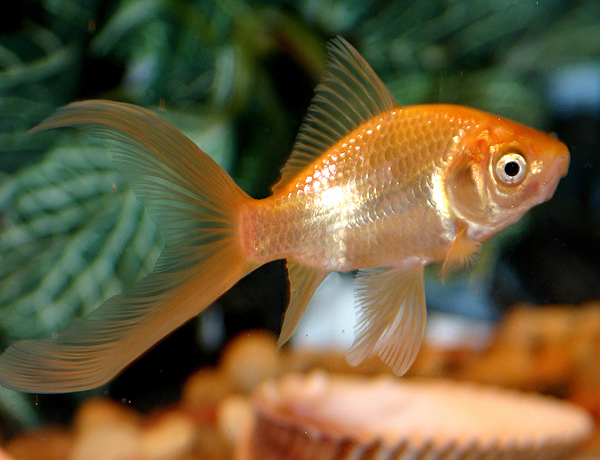
- Country of origin: United States
- Type: Single tailed

Classification
- BAS

The comet or comet-tailed goldfish is a single-tailed goldfish bred in the United States. It is similar to the common goldfish, except slightly smaller and slimmer, and is mainly distinguished by its long deeply forked tail. Comet goldfish tend to have a diverse variety of colors, unlike the common goldfish.

== Origins ==
The comet-tailed goldfish breed was developed in the United States from the common goldfish by Hugo Mulertt, a government worker, in the 1880s. The comet goldfish was first seen in the ponds of the U.S. Government Fish Commission in Washington, D.C. Mulertt later became a propagator of goldfish and an author of books on goldfish. He introduced the comet onto the fish-keeping market in quantity.

== Description ==
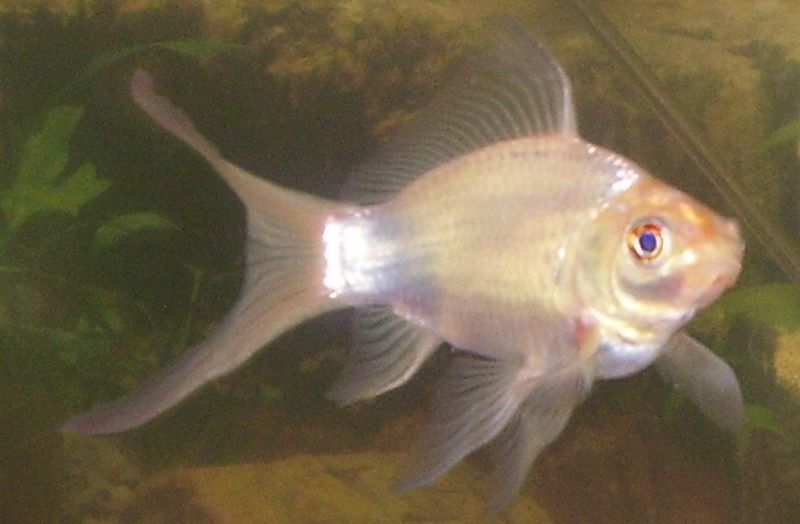
A white comet goldfish

The comet goldfish can be distinguished from the common goldfish by its long, single and deeply forked tail fin. Comets with yellow, orange, red, white, and red-and-white coloration are common. The red coloration mainly appears on the tailfin and dorsal fin, but can also appear on the pelvic fin.

The comet is more active than most other goldfish breeds. It is not unusual to see a comet dashing back and forth in its tank, racing around in a playful manner. Due to the comet's hardy and active nature, and the relative ease in caring for them, they are the breed best suited to ponds and outdoor pools. They are often kept with koi in outdoor ponds. Comets have a natural life span of 5 to 14 years and may live even longer in optimal conditions.

=== Variants ===
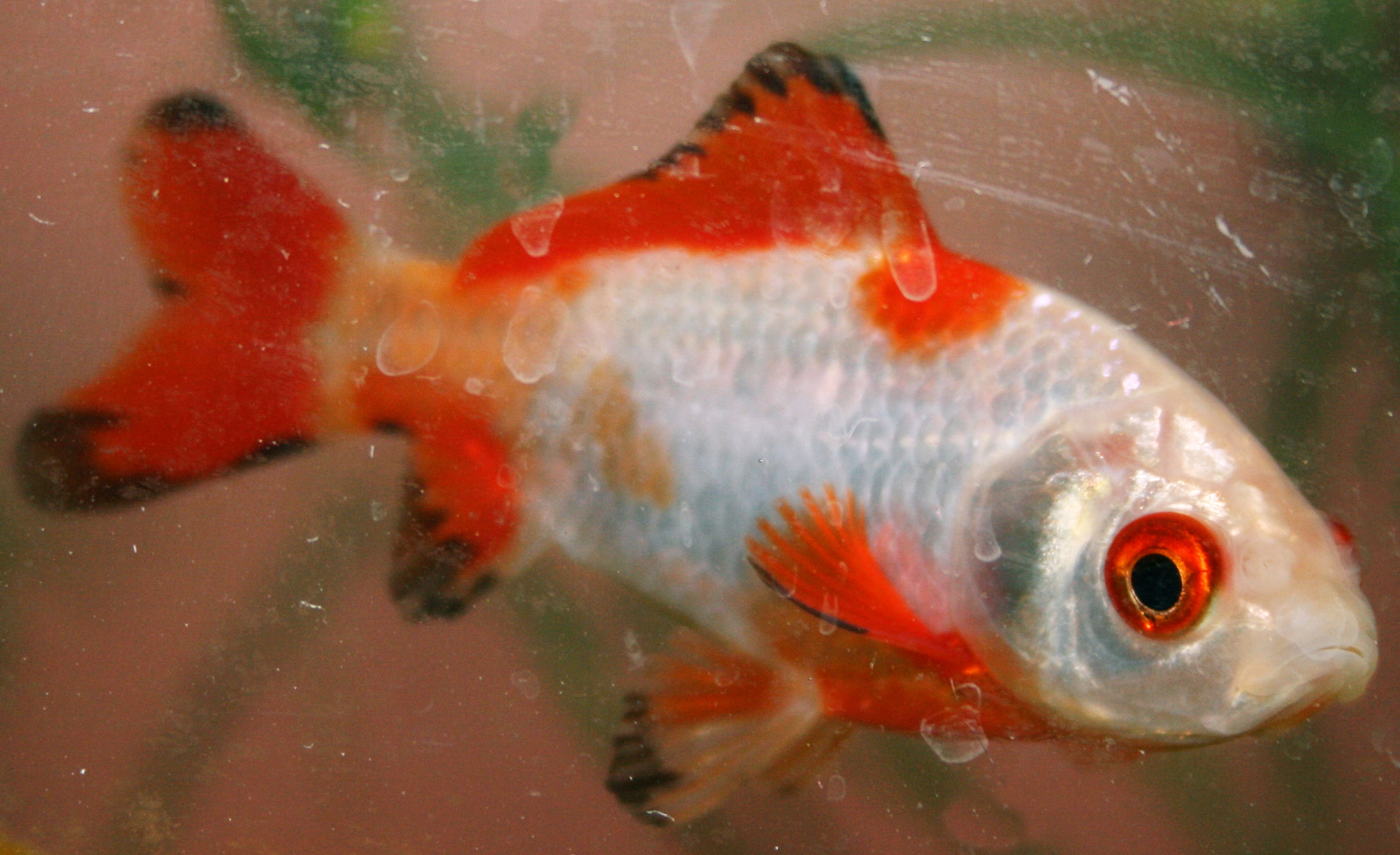
A juvenile Sarasa goldfish

- Sarasa comets are characterized by their red-and-white coloration and resemble the Kōhaku color pattern in koi. Sarasa Comets have long flowing fins and are very hardy fish. Although the Sarasa Comet is originally from China, the word 'sarasa' is of Japanese origin.
- The Tancho single-tail is similar to the comet-tail but it has a silver-colored body and fins with a single red patch on the head.

== Goldfish farming ==
Goldfish are commonly bred on fish farms in many parts of the world. In most instances, the fish produced are offered for sale to aquarists. However, in North America, there is a demand for goldfish used as bait or "feeder fish" to other fish by anglers. Due to the relatively inexpensive prices of comet goldfish, they may also be used as prizes in carnivals or other places of entertainment.
