= Wardley =

Wardley may refer to:

== Organisations ==
- Wardley (company), a fish food manufacturer
- Wardley, a former merchant banking division of The Hongkong and Shanghai Banking Corporation

== People ==
- Fabio Wardley (born 1994), British boxer
- John Wardley (born 1950), English concept designer and developer of theme parks
- Liz Wardley (born 1980), Papua New Guinean skipper
- Niky Wardley, English actress
- Stanley Wardley, English city engineer
- Stuart Wardley (born 1974), English footballer

== Places in England ==
- Wardley, Gateshead, Tyne and Wear
- Wardley, Rutland
- Wardley, Greater Manchester
- Wardley, West Sussex, a U.K. location
- Wardleys, Hambleton, Lancashire

== See also ==
- Wardley map, a method for organizational strategy invented by Simon Wardley
