= Buffalo worm =

Buffalo worm as a trade name may refer to:

- Alphitobius diaperinus in larval state as feed or food
- Alphitobius laevigatus in larval state as feed
