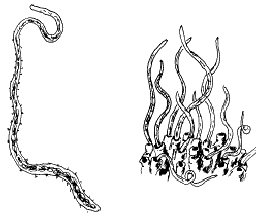

Scientific classification
- Kingdom: Animalia
- Phylum: Annelida
- Clade: Pleistoannelida
- Clade: Sedentaria
- Class: Clitellata
- Order: Tubificida
- Family: Naididae
- Genus: Tubifex
- Species: T. tubifex

Binomial name
- Tubifex tubifex (O. F. Müller, 1774)

= Tubifex tubifex =

Species of annelid worm

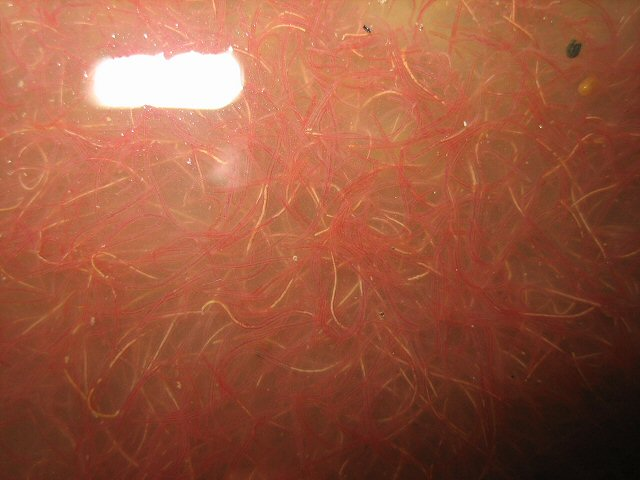
Tubifex worms in a puddle in Norfolk, England

Tubifex tubifex, also called the sludge worm, sewage worm, or simply tubifex worm, is a species of tubificid segmented worm which inhabits the sediments of lakes and rivers on several continents. Tubifex tubifex is a slender segmented annelid that can reach lengths of up to about 20 cm.

== Taxonomy and classification ==
Tubifex likely includes several species, but distinguishing between them is difficult because their reproductive organs, commonly used in species identification, are reabsorbed after mating, and because the external characteristics of the worm vary with changes in salinity.

== Distribution and habitat ==
They usually inhabit the bottom sediments of lakes, rivers, and occasionally sewer lines and outlets. Studies have shown that there was a higher abundance of T. tubifex associated with or near some riparian land use and water management practices.

== Ecology ==
The worms can survive in oxygen-depleted environments by waving hemoglobin-rich tail ends to exploit all available oxygen and can exchange carbon dioxide and oxygen through their thin skins, in a manner similar to frogs. They can also survive in areas heavily polluted with organic matter that almost no other species can endure. By forming a protective cyst and lowering its metabolic rate, T. tubifex can survive drought and food shortage. Encystment may also function in the dispersal of the worm.

These worms ingest sediments, selectively digest bacteria, and absorb molecules through their body walls. Tubifex tubifex tend to target the size range of <63 μm fraction or finer of silt and clay. Micro-plastic ingestion by Tubifex worms acts as a significant risk for trophic transfer and biomagnification of microplastics up the aquatic food chain.

== Life cycle ==
Due to high fertility, Tubifex tubifex can produce a range from 92 to 340 eggs per harvest at a temperature ranging of 0.5-30° Celsius. Tubifex tubifex has been well studied within a laboratory setting, where individuals have been documented producing up to 200 embryos over a 72-day reproductive period. These cultures have shown Tubifex tubifex deposited cocoons on a 3-month basis when maintained at a temperature of 17° Celsius. A single Tubifex tubifex lays around 38 cocoons during a single reproduction period, averaging 12 embryos per cocoon. In laboratory conditions, it was observed that the number of embryos per cocoon increases with a greater percentage of organic carbon in the given substrate.
