= Leeward Islands (disambiguation) =

Leeward Islands are a group of islands situated in the northeastern Caribbean Sea.

Leeward Islands may also refer to:

== Places ==
- Leeward Islands (Society Islands), in French Polynesia in the South Pacific Ocean
- Pulau Bawah, formerly Leeward Island, in the Anambas Islands Regency, Indonesia
- Sotavento Islands, Cape Verde

== Other uses ==
- 45614 Leeward Islands, a British LMS Jubilee Class locomotive

== See also ==
- Leeward (disambiguation)
- Windward Islands (disambiguation)
- Leeward Antilles, a chain of islands in the Caribbean
- British Leeward Islands, a British colony 1671–1958 in the Lesser Antilles
- Northwestern Hawaiian Islands, or Leeward Hawaiian Islands, in the Pacific Ocean
