= Common goldfish =

Breed of goldfish

- Country of origin: China
- Type: Single tailed

Classification
- BAS

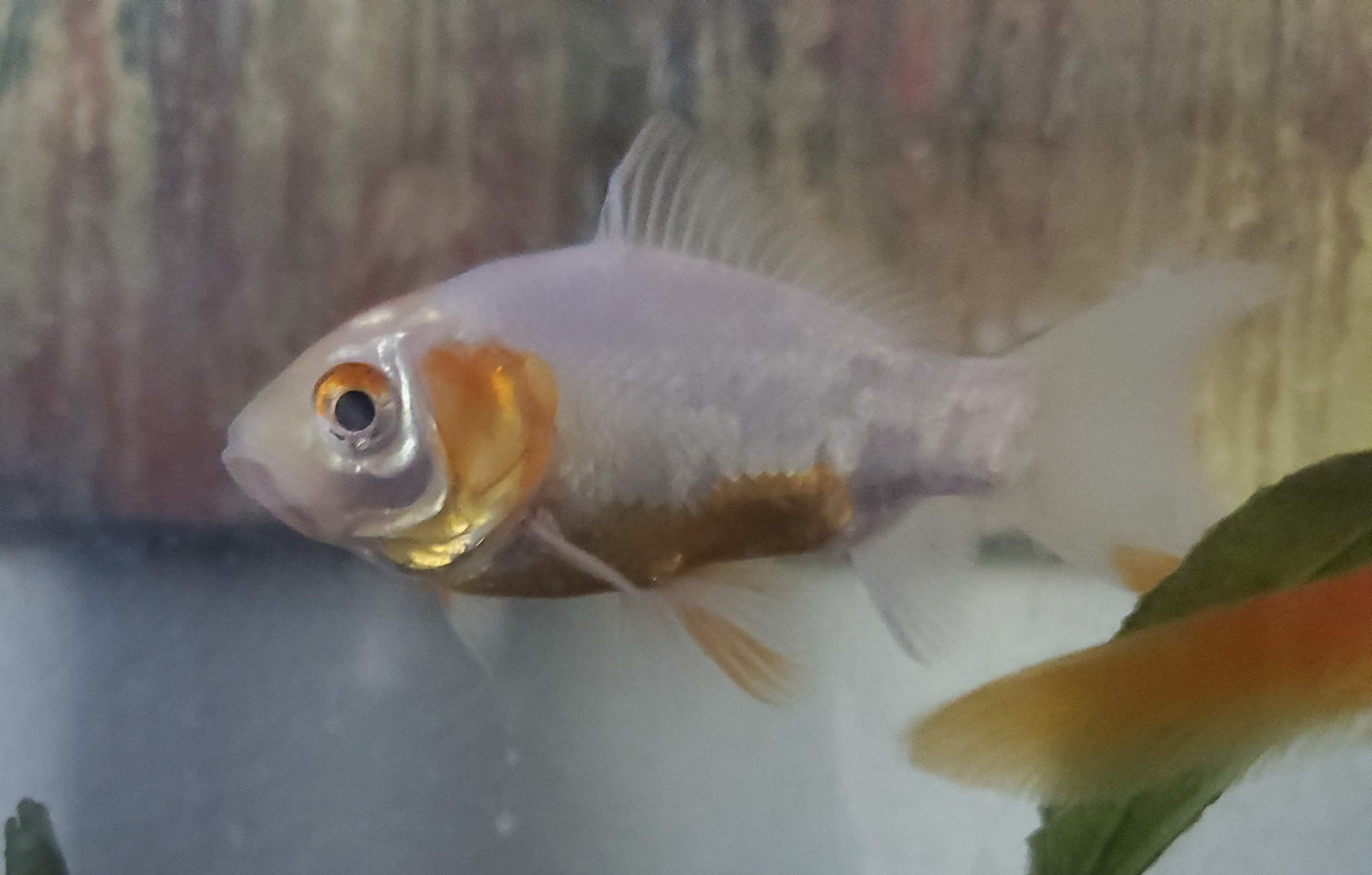
Young goldfish with white coloring

The common goldfish is a breed as well as the standard and most common variety of goldfish and a family of Cyprinidae in the order cypriniformes. Goldfish are descendants of wild carp from East Asia. Many fancy goldfish varieties have been developed through selective breeding from more simply formed goldfish over centuries of domestication. Common goldfish come in a variety of colors including red, orange, red/white, white/black, yellow/white, blue, grey/brown, olive green, yellow, white, and black, with the most common variation being orange, hence the name. The brightness, duration, and vividness of the color may be an indication of the fish's health status, but not always, as water conditions and quality of care affect the fish's appearance. It is particularly popular in China, while in Japan it traditionally competes with the Japanese rice fish for the title of the country’s most popular ornamental fish.

== Physical Traits ==
Common goldfish's body is shaped as a laterally compressed, elongated football. They have five sets of find that is common across the family Cyprinidae. The have 3 single dorsal, anal, and rounded forked caudal fin. As well as paired ventral and pectoral fins.

== Temperament ==
Common goldfish are social animals that prefer living in groups. They can coexist with any coldwater fish, as long as they're tame and sociable. With the provision of general care and attention, common goldfish can become tame. Once familiar with the face of its owner, swimming towards the fish keeper during feeding time can be observed, and hand-feeding becomes possible. Small goldfish will normally avoid any form of human contact. However, this fear ceases in a middle-sized and mature goldfish. A mature goldfish is more likely to eat directly from its owner's hand without evident hesitation. While this behaviour is welcomed by goldfish owners, it may be problematic in outdoor ponds where predators may eat such friendly prey. Mature goldfish will also explore their surroundings through nibbling or grazing behaviour.

If transferred into a tank with other goldfish, a common goldfish would normally try to communicate and familiarize itself with its new tank mates by rubbing up against the body of other fish. The most common introductory gesture is by swimming side by side with another goldfish with its head facing forward, or by swimming side by side with another goldfish with its head facing the opposite direction, or even by swimming above another goldfish in a perpendicular fashion. Schooling is a common behaviour when there is a new fish in the tank. After some time, this schooling behaviour eventually ceases, and soon every individual fish will swim and explore the aquarium on its own. Aggressive behaviour is uncommon when a new specimen is introduced into a settled school of goldfish.

Hierarchy during feeding is commonly observed, in which the larger goldfish receives most of the food. However, small goldfish may become aggressive or competitive feeders despite the presence of larger fish, which is usually considered a good sign, as a willingness to feed indicates a healthy goldfish.

== Housing ==
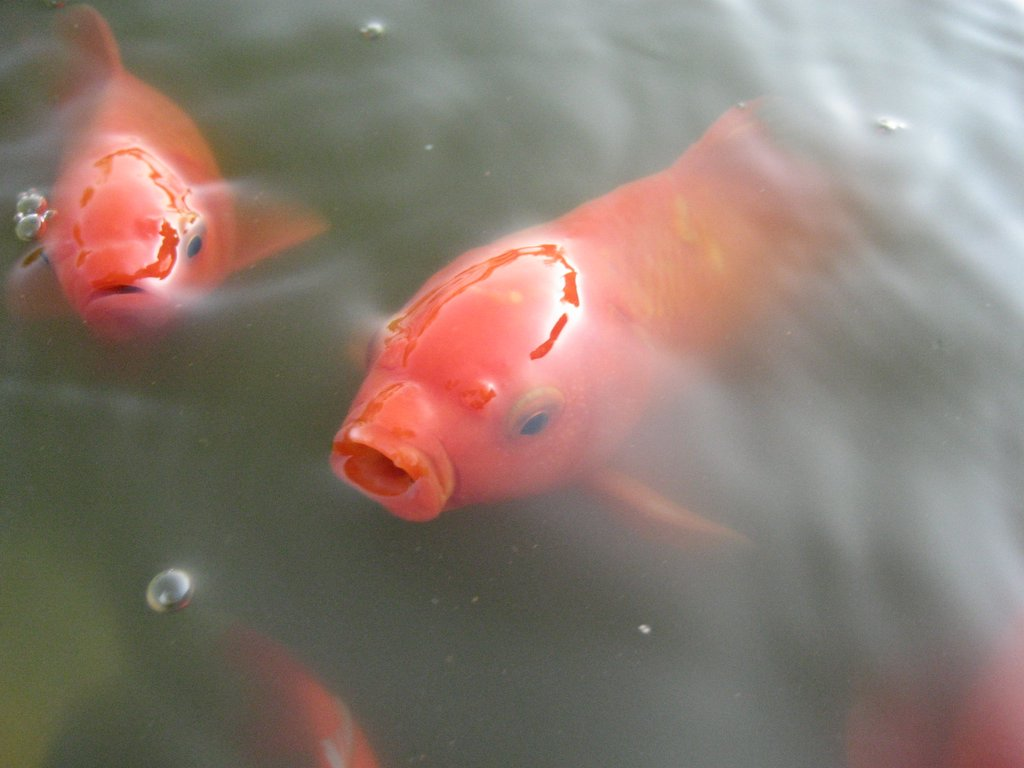
Common goldfish in a pond

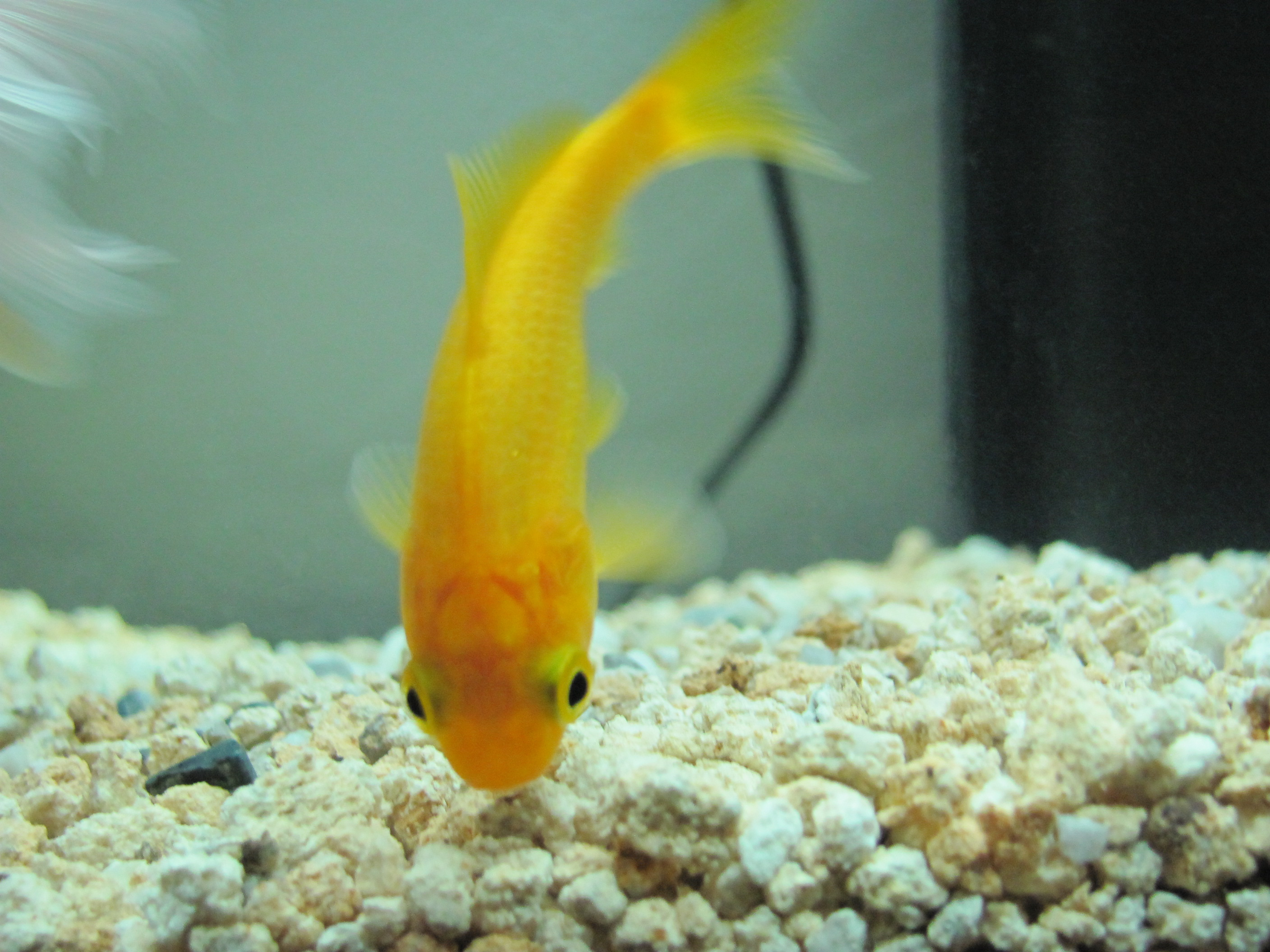
Common goldfish in aquarium

It is a common practice to keep common goldfish in a small bowl, but this allows waste in the water to build up to toxic levels and does not provide enough oxygen. For each small/young goldfish, there should be a minimum of 10 US liquid gallons (38 liters; 8.3 imperial gallons) of water. A good filter, with no heater, is recommended because these fish can get larger than 12 inches (300 mm). Tank minimum recommendations range up to 75 US gallons (280 L; 62 imp gal), although there is no maximum size. If there is concern about the fish not getting enough oxygen, particularly when it is warm, a water pump, such as a fountain pump or mini pond pump will pull the CO_{2} water from the bottom, expel it, and the surface action will oxygenate the tank or pond. Contrary to popular belief, air pumps and airstones do not oxygenate directly and rely on bubbles breaking the surface to transfer oxygen to the fish's environment. Ideally, the water pump should push 10x the volume of the tank or pond plus an extra 100lph or gph. Goldfish will die without sufficient dissolved oxygen in the water. A filter that can do at least 10x filtration is best, which means that for every 10 gallons or liters of water, the filter should be able to cycle 100 gallons or liters per hour. If the oxygen in the water runs out then the fish may die or become unconscious. It is advised to move the fish to a basin of water full of freshwater.

Goldfish are curious fish that will quickly become bored without items in their tank or other fish to socialize with. If placed in a bare aquarium, goldfish will settle to the bottom and only move when fed or frightened by sudden jolts. However, if put in a tank with sufficient gravel, aquarium accessories, or plants (real or fake), they will make themselves at home.

Goldfish are not very territorial. However, if an aquarium is already too small for one goldfish, it will certainly be too small for two or more. Stress is not healthy for any goldfish. In a worst-case scenario, one or two fish will bully the rest to starvation. Cannibalism is usually rare (occurring maybe when a fish is dying or dead), but in cramped, stressful situations, goldfish may behave unpredictably. Disease is possible any time fish are stuck in small homes.

When adding goldfish to a new tank, it is important to place no more than two at a time. This allows helpful bacteria (which turn ammonia to nitrite and finally to nitrate) to grow. If introduced in too great a number before these bacteria grow, the goldfish will die from breathing in too much of their own untreated excrement. Even after the development of the biological filter, it is necessary to change about 20% of the water at least one time a week, or as necessary to prevent a buildup of harmful nitrate. The addition of live aquatic plants may reduce the number of times per month one will have to perform water changes, but only if the plants are growing (they will uptake nitrate as a source of nitrogen). It is also recommended, if needs must, never to remove all of the water from an established tank. Never do a water change over 90%; the remaining 10% of the water will help maintain the water cycle and the remaining good bacteria will soon re-establish themselves in the tank.

When doing a water change, it's ideal to avoid cleaning the filters at the same time because filters can contain helpful bacteria. In order to keep consistent amount of healthy bacteria, many fish keepers clean the aquarium filter every two weeks..

Common goldfish can be kept in water gardens or outdoor ponds throughout the year. Outdoor ponds have similar care requirements as indoor tanks, with some notable exceptions such as amount of sunlight, natural and artificial environment pollution (i.e. dead leaves, debris, runoff), algae, selection of pond mates (i.e. algae eaters, frogs, etc.). Outdoor ponds tend to become miniature aquatic ecosystems, attracting various animals and plants (see water gardens for more information). In hot climates, it is important that pond temperatures do not rise to dangerously high levels that will kill the fish. In the winter, fish may become sluggish and stop feeding. This does not mean they are sick, but rather that their metabolism has slowed. The pond must not freeze solid and there should be an open spot in the surface ice to allow oxygenation of the water. The ice should also not be struck, as this sends shock waves of sound pressure through the water, scaring the fish.

== Basic common goldfish care ==
Mature goldfish will require a minimum tank size of 20 gallons per fish to allow ample swimming room and create a "buffer zone" that will delay the effects toxins like ammonia and nitrites from building up quickly. A larger tank also promotes healthy growth and development. Fish bowls are not suitable for goldfish as they can quickly outgrow the tank itself, which causes the fish to lose its slime coat and die from ammonia poisoning. Not all water sources are safe for goldfish, as tap water from a city environment will usually contain chemicals like chlorine. A water conditioner can help remove chlorine and heavy metals to make the water safe and breathable for the fish.

Goldfish have a varied diet that can include pellets, flakes, vegetables, and blood worms. Overfeeding should be avoided as it can disrupt the biological balance and increase the risk of diseases. The recommended feeding amount is what the fish can consume in 2–3 minutes, once or twice a day, depending on the size of the fish. Filtration systems help keep the tank clean and remove toxins, while also promoting good bacteria growth. It is important to choose the right filtration system to keep nitrate levels low and prevent nitrate poisoning.

Regular water changes are crucial for maintaining a clean and safe tank environment. It is recommended to change 10–25% of the water at a time to avoid removing good bacteria from the tank. Cleaning the filter sponges and vacuuming the gravel can help remove debris and rotten food. Treated tap water at the same temperature as the tank water should be used to refill the tank. It is important to avoid using tap water to clean decorations, filters, and equipment as it can kill good bacteria.

Goldfish require adequate exposure to light to promote healthy sleeping patterns and maintain a similar environment to their natural habitat. While sunlight is beneficial, it is important to avoid exposing the fish to direct sunlight for extended periods as it can be harmful. A tank light is needed.

== Breeding ==
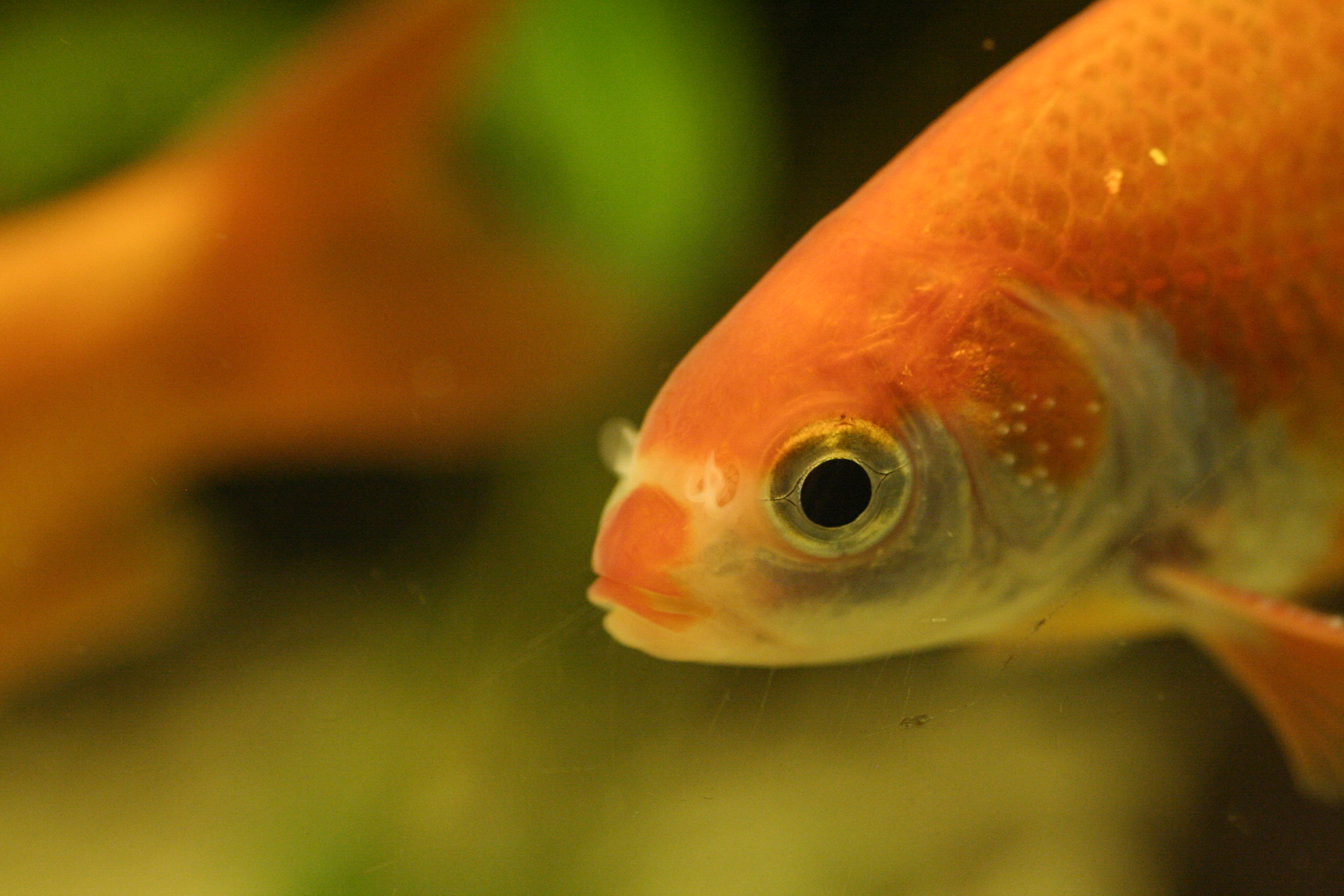
Goldfish exhibiting breeding tubercles on gill plate

Breeding common goldfish is relatively easy. In breeding conditions the male develops small white spots on his gill covers and the female will become plump. The male chases the female until she releases her eggs, then the male releases milt to fertilize the eggs. The eggs will then stick to any available surface. It is best to remove the eggs to a separate aquarium, as the adults are likely to eat them. When the eggs hatch into fry, they will need to be fed very small food such as hatched brine shrimp or a ready-made fry food. As they grow bigger, they can eat finely crumbled fish food. Eventually, the pieces of fish food can get bigger.

== Diseases ==
Common goldfish are hardy, but can contract diseases. These can be caused by poor water quality, overfeeding and overstocking. Goldfish are notoriously dirty, producing much waste, and continually stir up the substrate in their infinite search for food. In small aquariums, illnesses in common goldfish can quickly become fatal and require prompt treatment. Symptoms that indicate sick fish include cuts on any of the fins, a change in scale or eye coloration, excretions from the nostrils, scales falling off or the fish frequently rising towards the water surface. Many specialty treatments are available in the market to manage specific diseases.

Diseases frequently seen in common goldfish include:

Swim Bladder Disease is developed when the fish has buoyancy problems due to internal gas build-up. Swim bladder disease may be caused by insufficient fiber, poor water quality, or overfeeding. The fish "may also look physically swollen or bloated..."; it may also swim sideways or upside down. Treatment starts with testing the water to ensure cleanliness, then the goldfish should fast for three days if no improvements are made. If the fish still seems ill, then it should be fed low-protein foods and vegetables.

Fin Rot is developed from bacteria eating or deteriorating the fins. The disease originates from "poor water quality, overcrowding, sudden temperature changes, fin nipping, or aggressive fish"; this leads to torn and shredded fins that could deteriorate the body tissue and prevent the regrowth of their fins. Fin rot must be treated early to prevent further damage to the body tissue, so the disease does not spread. Treatments start with clean water, adding aquarium salt to clean the water; if that does not work, then commercial products should be used along with weekly water changes.

White Spot Disease is caused by the protozoan parasite Ichthyophthirius multifiliis, colloquially known as "ich". The parasite embeds itself into the host's skin to feed on its tissue and blood. This causes the epidermal cells to proliferate and form pinhead-sized white spots that appear on the fins and body. It is usually introduced into the pond or aquarium on infected fish or contaminated equipment. Once considered a tropical fish disease, it is now a common goldfish illness. Fish may not always display the characteristic white spots. Ich sometimes limits infection to the gills and the only sign that a fish is infected is an increase in breathing rate, lethargy, and clamped fins. If left untreated, in a small volume of water such as an aquarium the infected fish can quickly succumb to the rapidly multiplying parasites. The parasite can only be killed once it has left the host. To speed up the parasite's five-stage life cycle, increase the water temperature to between 27 and 30 °C (81–86 °F). Water quality parameters—ammonia, nitrite, nitrate and pH—need to be optimal. Non-iodized plain cooking salt or aquarium salt is added to the water at a concentration of 0.3% or 3 teaspoons per gallon. The first teaspoon is added immediately, the second after 12 hours, and the last 12 hours later. Within a few days, the cysts should start disappearing. The fish is left in the salt bath for a few more days to allow its skin to heal while the water temperature is slowly decreased.

Fungal Infection is the growth of fungus, which could lead to parasitic infections, ulcers, or open wounds. The fungus symptoms could also lead to a secondary fungal infection. There are "cotton-like growths along the body and fins", which is caused by dirty water. Treatments start by moving the goldfish to a hospital tank and then clearing the environment with methylene blue. If the condition is serious, however, the goldfish can just have a cleaner tank and the fungal infection should clear up over time.

Ammonia poisoning is caused by high levels of ammonia in the tank. Add ammonia reduction chemicals to the tank, or for an emergency release of ammonia, change the water 25 percent daily for one week until the symptoms decrease. Ammonia reduction chemicals must not be added as soon as the ammonia levels drop, as ammonia removers can starve the biological filter and cause the cycling process to start over.

Fish lice is a parasite. Fish lice move on the body of fish. The only visible parasites, they look like clear white splodges. These lice can have nasty health side effects to the fish. Try to avoid removing the lice manually; use anti-parasite medicine.

Bacterial diseases can be deadly, but treatments are available at local fish stores.

== Lifespan ==
Goldfish can live for long periods of time if they are fed a varied diet and housed in proper water conditions. The average lifespan of a goldfish is ten to fifteen years. The longest-lived goldfish on record lived to age 43. The oldest living goldfish was Tish, won by a UK family at a funfair. Tish was recognized into the Guinness Book of World Records as the longest living goldfish. Improper care or life in a bowl greatly reduces the typical lifespan of a goldfish.

== As feeder fish ==
Common goldfish are often used as live prey for freshwater turtles, notably red-eared sliders, and carnivorous fish such as oscars. When fed exclusively, feeder goldfish are a poor source of nutrients. They can introduce unwanted pathogens into the home aquarium, as they are usually given minimal care before being sold.

== Confusions with comet goldfish ==
The common goldfish are often confused with comet goldfish, a distinct breed. The two breeds are often mixed together at many pet stores and aquarium stores. The breeds differ in the relative size of the body and fins. The comet goldfish has longer fins but a shorter and slender body size, and thus resembles tracing comets. The most recognizable difference is their tails. Usually, a common goldfish has a short stubby tail, and the comet's tail extends over half of the body length. The common goldfish usually resembles the wild carp more closely than the comet goldfish. Comets are sometimes said to display a wider variety of colors, but common goldfish also display many of the same types of colors, including red/white, blue, red, orange, yellow, and other two-toned colors like black/orange.
