= Wardley (company) =

American fish food company

- Company type: brandname of The Hartz Mountain Corporation
- Industry: Pet supplies
- Founded: 1950
- Headquarters: United States
- Key people: Wardley-Hartz Company
- Products: Pet products
- Website: www.hartz.com

Wardley is one of the largest domestically manufactured line of aquatic fish foods and remedies in the United States.

== Profile and history ==
It was primarily established as a distributor of various aquarium and pet products in 1950 and has grown into a predominant brand of aquatics products within The Hartz Mountain Corporation.

Wardley is one of 17 pet food manufacturers that established the American Pet Products Manufacturers Association, and is regarded as one of the most outstanding and successful serving the industry. It was also instrumental in the formation of the Pet Industry Joint Advisory Council (PIJAC). Fifty years since its founding, Wardley offers a broad range of more than 200 formulations addressing the special needs of both amateur and professional aquatic hobbyists.

Wardley provides a full range of nutritional foods (flakes, pellets, crumbles or sticks) for goldfish, betta fish, tropical fish, pond fish and marine fish. Among their products include test kits, water conditioners and pet remedies.

== See also ==
- Fish food
