= Windward (disambiguation) =

Windward is the direction upwind from the point of reference, alternatively the direction from which the wind is coming.

Windward may also refer to:

== Places ==
- Windward High School, a school in Bellingham, Washington, United States
- Windward Islands, in the West Indies
- Windward Islands (Society Islands), the eastern group of the Society Islands in French Polynesia
- Windward Mall, an enclosed shopping center located in Kāneʻohe, Hawaiʻi
- Windward Passage, a strait in the Caribbean Sea
- Windward River, a river in Fiordland, New Zealand
- Windward School, a school in Los Angeles, California, United States
- Windward Viaducts, highway viaducts on the island of O‘ahu

== Organizations ==
- Windward Express, airline company
- Windward Performance, aircraft design house and manufacturer
- Windward Studios, software development company

== Other ==
- MS Windward, a cruise ship
