= Sharks in captivity =

One of the several whale sharks housed at the Georgia Aquarium

Several species of sharks are kept in captivity in public aquaria. In home aquaria, size constraints mean that only the smallest sharks are typically viable as pets.

== Public aquaria ==
Until recently only a few benthic species of shark, such as horn sharks, leopard sharks, catsharks, and zebra sharks, had survived in aquarium conditions for up to a year or more. This gave rise to the belief that sharks, as well as being difficult to capture and transport, were difficult to care for. A better knowledge of sharks has led to more species (including the large pelagic sharks) being able to be kept for far longer. At the same time, transportation techniques have improved and long distance movement of sharks is becoming easier. Several attempts to keep a great white shark in captivity have been made, but most specimens died or had to be released after a short time. One example, placed in the Okinawa Churaumi Aquarium in Japan, only survived for three days. The longest a great white was held in captivity was at the Monterey Bay Aquarium, in September 2004. A young female was kept in an outdoor tank for 198 days before releasing her back into the wild. In the following years, the Monterey Bay Aquarium hosted five more juvenile white sharks for temporary stays before ending its program in 2011.

=== Behavior ===
When introduced to their new habitat some mature sharks have refused food despite the abundance and variety of feeding methods used. Sharks are usually seen to live a solitary existence, rarely moving about in group events, although, a tank could house up to four or five species during the same time period. It has been commonly seen that lemon and nurse sharks occupy the bottom of the tank floor. Occasionally, they will take a swim no more than two or three feet off the bottom. Bull sharks, sandbar sharks, and sand tiger sharks continuously swim at mid-depth. Larger tiger sharks inhabit the upper region of the tank where their dorsal fin is breaking the surface frequently. Swimming patterns seen from sharks in captivity are that of blacktip, bull, and lemon sharks being active 24 hours and those of sandbars, nurse and sand tigers being active at certain times of the day/night. However, within some aquaria this could be attributed to the different feeding times of these species. In captivity, sandbar, sand tiger, and nurse sharks are predicted to be less aggressive in that no aggressive biting is seen after feeding. The foremost behavior observed from those in captivity was curiosity, reasonings being due to less competition for food and lack of stimulation.

== Home aquaria ==
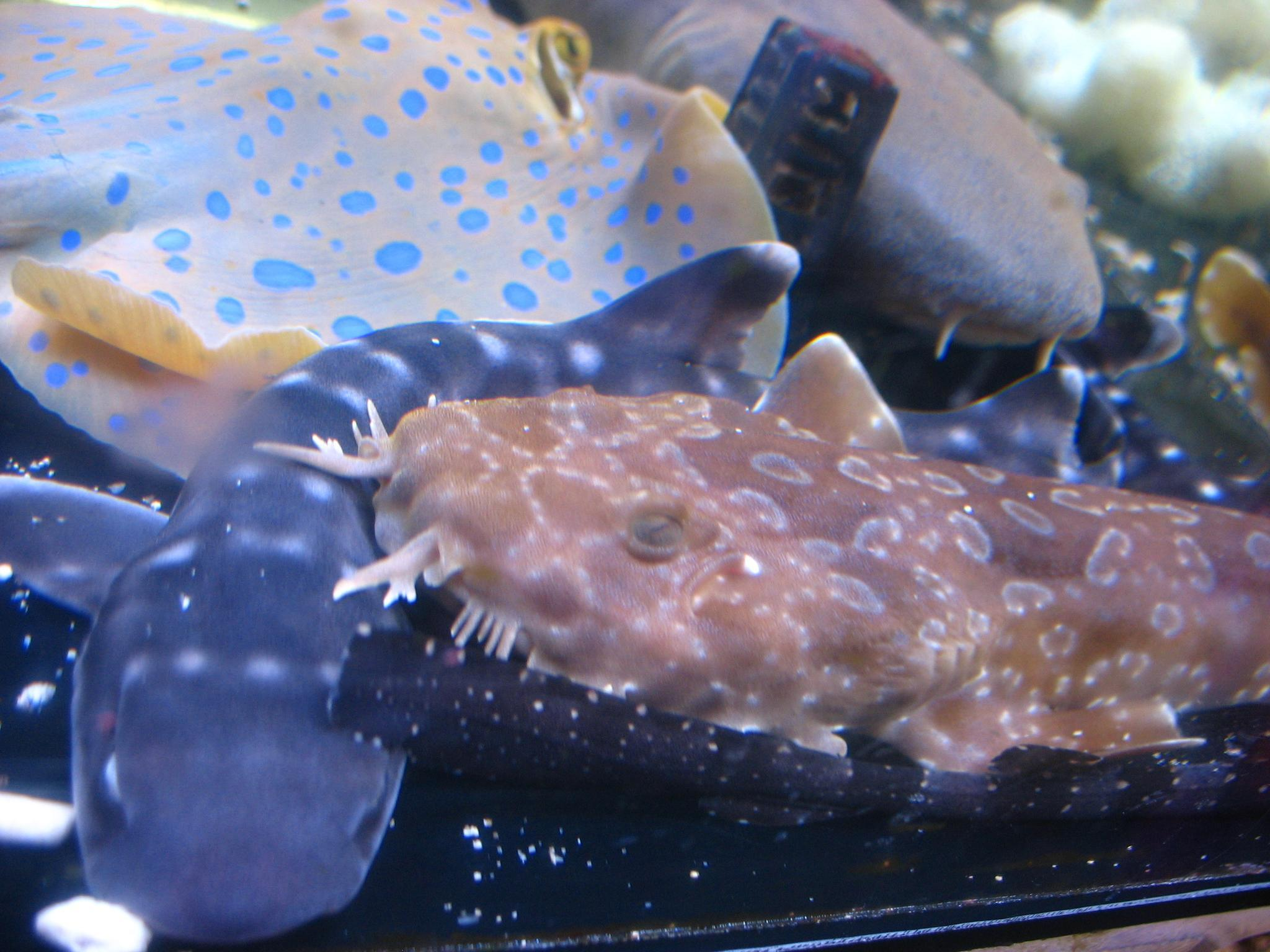
Various elasmobranchs for sale as pets at the 6th Avenue Aquarium in San Francisco, California

Most species of shark are not suitable for domestic aquaria and not every species of shark sold by pet stores make good inhabitants for personal aquaria. Some species of sharks can also be kept well in home saltwater aquaria. Uninformed or unscrupulous dealers sometimes sell juvenile sharks like the nurse shark, which upon reaching adulthood will have far outgrown typical home aquaria. Public aquaria are generally not interested in accepting donated specimens that have overgrown their housing and some shark owners have been tempted to release them into the wild.

=== Housings ===
However, some species of shark can make prized additions to home aquaria. Species appropriate to home aquaria represent considerable spatial and financial investments as they generally approach adult lengths of 3 feet and can live up to 25 years. Sharks must be housed in aquaria at or exceeding 180 gallons in volume, with more active species requiring more space. Surface area is an even more significant consideration for aquarists than volume as it is the determining factor for the amount of oxygen that ends up being dissolved in the water, and therefore critical to the sharks' respiration. Choice of aquarium substrate is also important because a sharp, rough bed can irritate a shark's soft underbelly, or in severe cases lead to fatal infections. Shark aquaria are generally advised to be decorated "conservatively" in order to leave space for the animal to move more freely during daily activities. A cave, however, is often an appropriate addition for some shy species.

=== Diet and nutrition ===
Sharks are very frequently overfed by amateur aquarists, which can lead to obesity or unnaturally fast growth rates. Captive sharks are healthiest when fed at levels similar to their food intake in the wild. Usually this amounts to 1-3% of their body weight weekly. However, aquarium conditions and species disposition are considered by conscientious aquarists when feeding captive sharks. Relatively sedentary species, such as wobbegongs can live on feedings occurring once or twice weekly. More active species may require to be fed three or four times per week to maintain satisfactory health. Sharks living in cooler water have slower metabolisms than sharks in warmer water housings and therefore require less food.

The most common staple food provided to captive sharks in home aquaria is frozen fish. The freezing process used to store foods for sharks often results in the food items losing nutrient value. Lost nutrients are replaced by vitamin supplements, which are marketed commercially, sometimes by companies generally associated with more typical pet foods (such as Purina Mills). Uncorrected nutrient deficiencies inherent in the frozen food diet can cause considerable detriment to the health of captive specimens. Conditions such as popeye, ascites, and anemia are known to occur in captive sharks that are deficient in some essential vitamin. Vitamin B deficiency results in a treatable condition where the shark's back arches and it swims in a circular motion.

Feeding sharks frozen non-marine fish can result in deficiencies of omega-3 fatty acids, which can result in "fat infiltration of the liver," which can impede the organ's function seriously enough for major health issues.

=== In community tanks ===
Sometimes sharks are unwittingly put in harm's way when aquarists include potentially dangerous tankmates in the same aquarium. Hobbyists generally don't think of other fish being a threat to sharks, but triggerfish, angel fish, puffers, and wrasses can all injure them. A large grouper is capable of consuming smaller sharks. Sometimes docile bottom feeding sharks are put at risk because of the fish that feed on the ocean bottom, sedentary sharks are simply an extension of the substrate." Another problem aquarists keeping sharks with other types of fish have encountered is that the smaller, more passive aquarium-friendly shark species often have difficulty competing with their tankmates for the food provided by the aquarist. Sharks are predatory themselves and may maul or consume tankmates smaller or weaker than themselves.

== See also ==
- Aquarium
