= Bath treatment (fishkeeping) =

Disease treatments in fish cultures

Bath treatments are easy to carry out disease treatments that originated since the earliest days of goldfish culture. One of the most effective procedure is called the salt bath which is quite effective in eradicating ciliated parasites from the fish. However, there are also useless, thus not recommended, bath treatments such as the use of certain antibiotics or vitamins in the bath. Bath treatment can either be short-term (a "dip") or long-term (from a few hours to 12 or 24 hours or longer).

A number of medications and water treatments are used in this way. Salt is the most effective bath treatment, and is used to eliminate ciliated protozoan parasites (including ich in small fish); also used to curb the absorption of nitrite, and to reduce the osmotic pressure exerted by fresh-water on any hole in the skin or gill. Potassium permanganate and ionic copper are used to treat similar ailments.

Various antibiotics, such as metronidazole and furan are used in aquarium care. Formalin, formaldehyde gas in water, is used to as a fungicide and treatment against some bacterial infections, ciliated protozoans and flukes.

Synthetic antiparasitics such as Lufenuron, Praziquantel, and Chloramine-T are sometimes used in bath treatments, as are insecticides like Diflubenzuron. Organic dyes such as malachite green, methylene blue and acriflavine are also used to treat parasites and fungal infections.
