= Hikari (company) =

Japanese fish food brand

- Type: trademark of Kyorin Food Industries, Ltd.
- Industry: Fishkeeping
- Founded: 1877
- Headquarters: Japan
- Key people: Tozaemon Kamihata; Tokichi Kamihata; Shigezo Kamihata
- Products: Fish food
- Website: www.hikariusa.com

Hikari is a line of specialty fish food brand manufactured by Kyorin Food Industries, Ltd. in Japan.

== History and profile ==
Kyorin Food Industries, Ltd. is a part of the Kamihata Fish Industry Group together with its sister companies namely the Kamihata Fish Industries, Ltd. and the Kyorin Company, Ltd. The history of Kyorin Food Industries, Ltd. as a cultivator of Koi, goldfish and fish diets dates back to 1877 when a Japanese named Tozaemon Kamihata started Koi carp cultivation. In 1946, another Kamihata, Tokichi Kamihata, opened a Koi carp store in Himeji City, Hyōgo Prefecture, Japan. Then in 1961, Shigezo Kamihata established the Kamihata Fish Industries, Ltd. The Kyorin Company, Ltd. was formally established in 1968 to manage the wholesale division of Kamihata Fish Industries, Ltd. The Kamihata Group then established other branches in Japan including Tokyo (1989), Hongkong (1991), China (1999) and Singapore (2001). It has a representative office in the United States under the company name, Hikari USA.

Kamihata Fish Industries Ltd. exhibited their specialty products at the Interzoo Exhibition in 2004 and 2006, which is an international pet business exhibition, at Nuremberg Messe, Germany.

== Hikari foods and fancy goldfish headgrowths ==
Izhak Kroshinsky, a leading American Ranchu goldfish breeder and co-author of the book The Fancy Goldfish: A Complete Guide to Care and Collecting (Chapter 10, Breeding Ranchus, page 171) wrote: "Some manufacturers of pellet foods claim to incorporate headgrowth enhancers. I have used Hikari's lionhead pellets, and they do seem to accelerate headgrowth.

== See also ==
- Fish food
