= Bait fish =

Fish used as bait to attract predatory fish

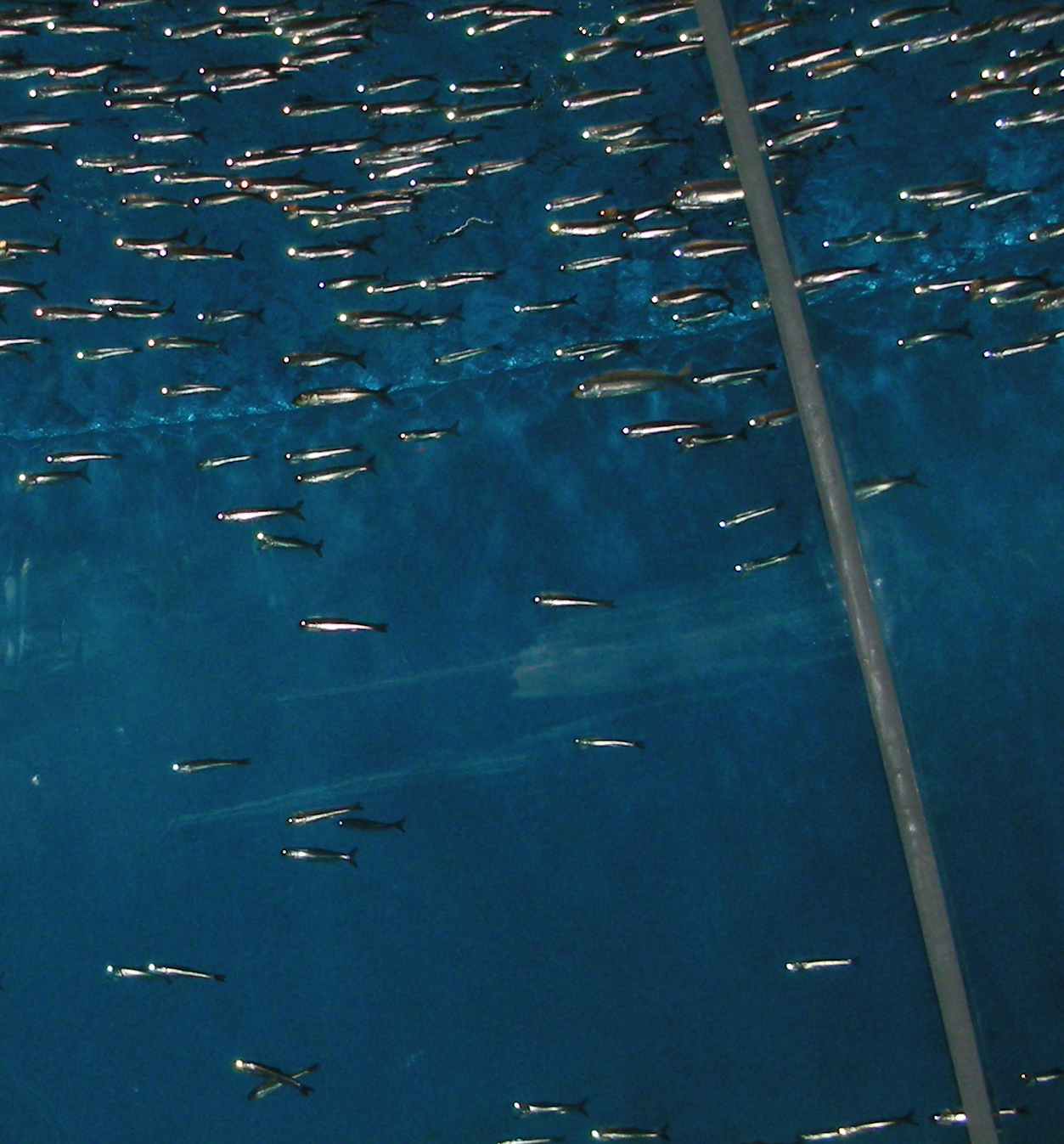
Anchovies are common baitfish in the ocean.

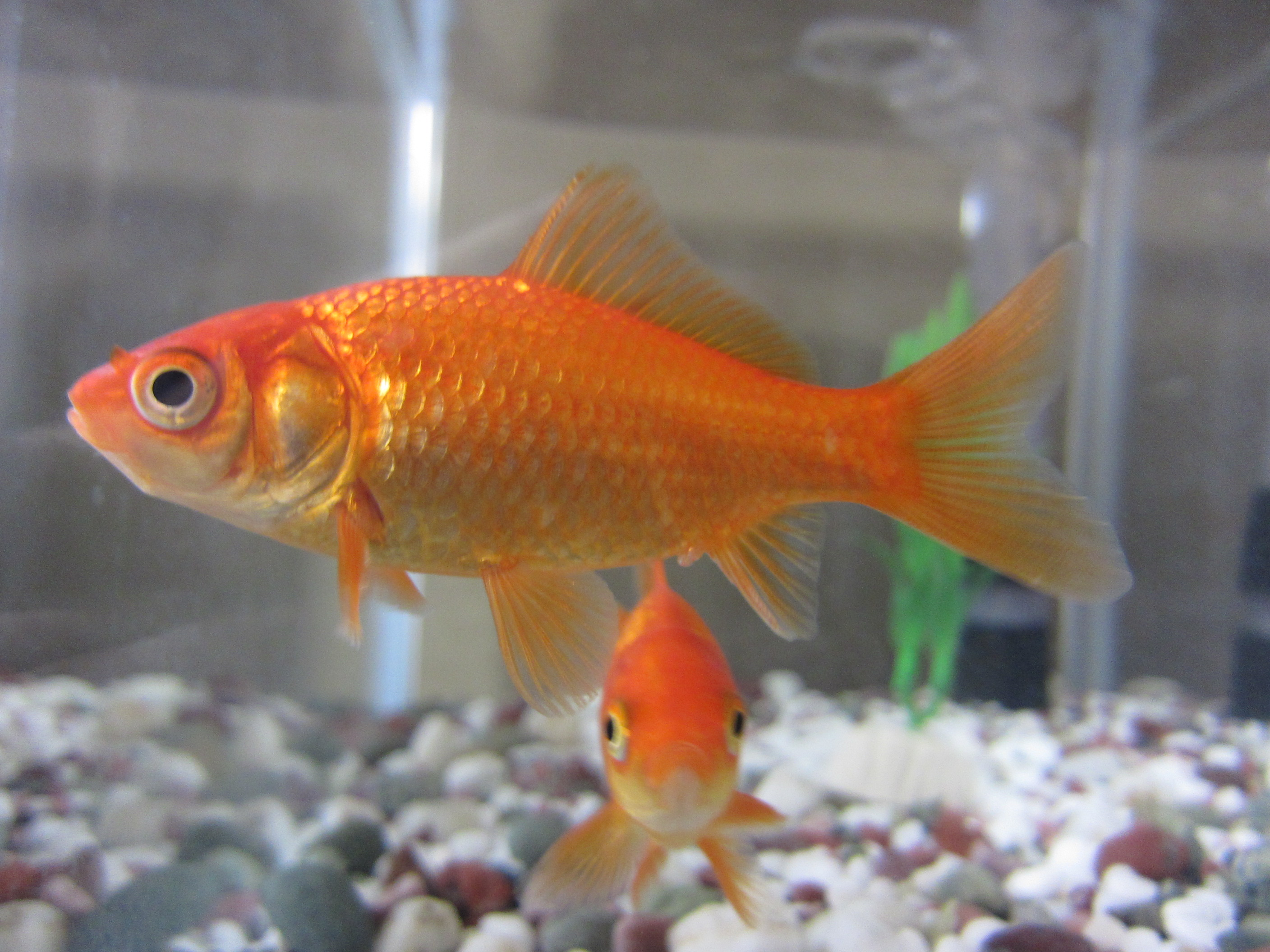
Feeder Goldfish are common baitfish.

Bait fish (or baitfish) are small-sized fish caught and used by anglers as bait to attract larger predatory fish, particularly game fish. Baitfish species are typically those that are common and breed rapidly, making them easy to catch and in abundant supply.

== Overview ==
Examples of marine bait fish are anchovies, gudgeon, halfbeaks such as ballyhoo, and scad. Some larger fish such as menhaden, flying fish or ladyfish may be considered bait fish in some circles, depending on the size of the gamefish being pursued.

Freshwater bait fish include minnows from the carp family (Cyprinidae), sucker family (Catostomidae), topminnows from the killifish suborder (Cyprinodontoidei), shad family (Clupeidae), sculpin of the order Scorpaeniformes and sunfish family (Centrarchidae), excluding black basses and crappies.

Bait fish can be contrasted with forage fish. Bait fish is a term used particularly by recreational fishermen, although commercial fisherman also catch fish to bait longlines and traps. Forage fish is a fisheries term, and is used in that context. Forage fish are small fish that are preyed on in the wild by larger predators for food. The predators can be other larger fish, seabirds and marine mammals. Bait fish, by contrast, are fish that are caught by humans to use as bait for other fish. The terms also overlap in the sense that most bait fish are also forage fish, and most forage fish can also be used as bait fish.

Baitfish can be attracted either via scent, or by using light which actually works by attracting zooplankton, a primary food source for many baitfish, which are then drawn to the light.

Bait fish can also be contrasted with feeder fish. Feeder fish is a term used particularly in the context of fish aquariums. It refers essentially the same concept, small fish that are eaten by larger fish, but adapted for use in a different context.

Bait fish are consumed by larger, aquatic predators. Swimming in ocean water with bait fish can be dangerous, as these fish attract sharks. Bait fish will sometimes use whale sharks as a shield from their other predators such as tuna, as tuna are usually wary of approaching the sharks. The shark cannot attack the bait fish easily, as they constantly swim above them and are too fast for the shark to manoeuvre its mouth into position. However, the sharks eventually dive deep, where the bait fish cannot follow, and as the other predators finally dare attack the stranded bait fish, the shark comes back to eat numerous bait fish who are already preoccupied with the attacking tuna.

== Industry ==
There is a bait fish industry in North America, supplying mainly recreational fishermen, worth up to one billion dollars each year. For the southern United States alone Mittelmark et al. 1993 reports this was $56 million in 1987. Mittelmark et al. 1993 provide an economic analysis of the industry in Minnesota and budget and practice information at the enterprise level.

== Management and conservation ==
Bait fish are often short-lived and proliferative spawners. This means their populations can fluctuate rapidly, and they can often recover quickly when depleted. Regulations may exist to prevent overexploitation, as in Arkansas and Massachusetts. Studies by fisheries and conservation agencies monitor the health of bait fish populations, allowing regional governments to set quotas.

== See also ==
- Angling – Fishing technique
- Pilchard – Common name for various small, oily forage fish
