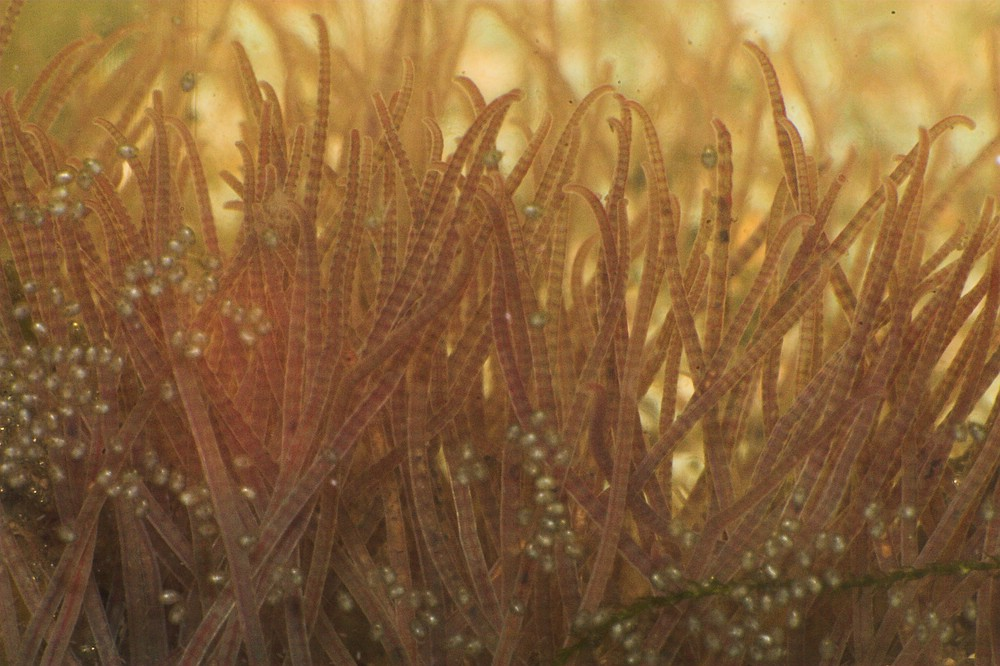

Scientific classification
- Kingdom: Animalia
- Phylum: Annelida
- Clade: Pleistoannelida
- Clade: Sedentaria
- Class: Clitellata
- Order: Tubificida
- Family: Naididae
- Subfamily: Tubificinae
- Genus: Tubifex; Lamarck, 1816

Type species
- Lumbricus tubifex Müller, 1774

= Tubifex =

Genus of annelid worms

Tubifex is a widespread genus of tubificid segmented worms (annelids) that inhabits the sediments of lakes, rivers and occasionally sewer lines. They are globally distributed. At least 13 species of Tubifex have been identified, with the exact number not certain, as the species are not easily distinguishable from each other.

== Reproduction ==
Tubifex worms are hermaphroditic: each individual has both male (testes) and female (ovaries) organs in the same animal. These minute reproductive organs are attached to the ventral side of the body wall in the celomic cavity. In mature specimens, the reproductive organs are clearly found on the ventral side of the body.

== Copulation and cocoon formation ==
Although the Tubifex worms are hermaphrodites, the male and female organs become mature at different times; thus self-fertilization is avoided, and cross-fertilization is encouraged. Two mature Tubifex worms undergo copulation by joining ventral and anterior surfaces together with their anterior ends pointing opposite directions. Thus, the spermathecal opening of each worm is nearer to the male apertures of another worm. The penial setae of one worm penetrate into the tissues of other worm and thus the conjugants are held together. At this stage, the sperm of one worm is passed into the spermathecae of the other worm. After copulation, they separate and begin to produce egg cases containing eggs, called cocoons. The cocoon is formed around the clitellum as a soft, box-like structure into which the ova and the sperm are deposited. Soon, the Tubifex worm withdraws its body from the egg case by its backward wriggling movements.

== Culturing Tubifex ==
Tubifex are raised commercially, mainly for fish food: the reddish Tubifex tubifex. Tubifex can be easily cultured on mass scale in containers with 50–75 mm thick pond mud at the bottom, blended with decaying vegetable matter and masses of bran and bread. Continuous, mild water flow is to be maintained in the container, with a suitable drainage system. After the arrangement of the system, the container is inoculated with Tubifex worms which can be obtained from nearby muddy canals or sewage canals. Within 15 days, clusters of worms develop and can be removed with mud in masses. When worms come to the surface due to lack of oxygen, they are collected and washed under brisk stream of water to remove residual mud attached to their bodies.

== Live food ==
Tubifex worms are often used as a live food for fish, especially tropical fish and certain other freshwater species. They have been a popular food for the aquarium trade almost since its inception, and gathering them from open sewers for this purpose was quite common until recently. Most are now commercially obtained from the effluent of fish hatcheries, or from professional worm farms.

Using these worms as a live food has come with certain problems over the years. When harvested from sewers, open bodies of water, and even from hatcheries, they may be infected with various diseases. This risk can be partially solved by keeping the worms under brisk running water until they have voided the contents of their digestive systems. However, the worms can still be vectors for whirling disease, which can affect salmonids. Additionally, they are very difficult for some fish to obtain in the wild, so certain fish, such as Rift Valley cichlids, will obsessively consume them until they make themselves sick. Additionally, while the worms have good-quality proteins, they also are very fattening, and are poor in certain important amino acids. Fish fed on them can grow rapidly, but may be less healthy and colorful than fish with more balanced diets. Lastly, in poorly cleaned aquaria, Tubifex can become established as a pest species, covering the bottom of the aquarium in a thick carpet which may be considered unsightly.

== Tubifex in sewers ==
In 2009, a large blobby mass made of colonies of Tubifex was found to be living in the sewers of Raleigh, North Carolina. Revealed by a snake camera inspection of sewer piping under the Cameron Village shopping center, videos of the "creature" went viral on YouTube in 2009 under the name "Carolina poop monster".

In 2013, an episode of the American television series Bar Rescue titled "Empty Bottles Full Cans" featured host Jon Taffer investigating the MT Bottle Bar in Tennessee, which had what the owners both claimed was a "natural spring" in the basement. The water there was in fact a natural underground spring without proper sewage pumping to filter it out from the basement and keep it from going stagnant; as a result, the water had turned to a black sludge-like consistency, and the episode featured multiple shock scenes where the camera focuses in on a large colony of Tubifex worms living there. The scene was later uploaded to YouTube under the title "Bar Rescue "Its natural spring water!" (MT Bottle)". Later in the episode, Taffer paid for a sewage system to irrigate and remove the excess water from the basement.

== Tubifex species ==
The genus includes the following species:

- Tubifex blanchardi (Vejdovský, 1891)
- Tubifex harmani Loden, 1979
- Tubifex costatus (Claparède, 1863)
- Tubifex ignotus (Stolc, 1886)
- Tubifex kryptus Bülow, 1957
- Tubifex longipenis (Brinkhurst, 1965)
- Tubifex montanus Kowalewski, 1919
- Tubifex nerthus Michaelsen, 1908
- Tubifex newaensis (Michaelsen, 1903)
- Tubifex newfei Pickavance & Cook, 1971
- Tubifex pescei (Dumnicka 1981)
- Tubifex pomoricus Timm, 1978
- Tubifex pseudogaster (Dahl, 1960)
- Tubifex smirnowi Lastockin, 1927
- Tubifex superiorensis Brinkhurst & Cook, 1971
- Tubifex tubifex (O. F. Müller, 1774)
