= Feeder =

Feeder may refer to:

Feeder line (disambiguation), a peripheral route or branch from a main line or trunk line

== Agriculture, biology and pets ==
- Feeder (livestock equipment)
- Feeder (beekeeping), any of several devices used in apiculture to supplement or replace natural food sources
- Bird feeder
- Aquarium fish feeder, an electric or electronic device that is designed to feed aquarium fish at regular intervals
- Feeder cattle
- Feeder fish, certain types of inexpensive fish commonly fed as live prey to captive animals
- Live food
- Feeder barn
- Livestock feeder (person), a farmer rearing and fattening livestock

=== Biology ===
- Feeder cell, a fibroblast, a type of cell used in human embryonic stem cell research
- Feeder cells, cells that line a Petri dish to provide cell contact for other cells so that the latter can grow on top of the former
- Bulk feeder, an organism that obtains nutrients by eating all of an organism
- Fluid feeder (disambiguation), organisms that feed on the fluid of other organisms
- Deposit feeder, organisms that obtain nutrients by consuming dissolved organic matter

== Machine ==
- Automatic document feeder, in office equipment
- Bowl feeder, used to feed components automation applications
- Rotary feeder, a component in a bulk or specialty material handling system
- Variable rate feeder, a piece of industrial control equipment used to deliver solid material at a known rate into some process
- Vibrating feeder, an instrument that uses vibration to feed material to a process or machine

=== Vehicles ===
- Feeder bus, bus service that brings people from a rail station or transit hub to their final destination or vice versa
- Feeder ship, a small-to-medium container ship which collects and distributes containers between ports and hubs

== Electrical ==
- Feeder, a power line that transfers power from a distribution substation to the distribution transformers in electric power distribution
- Feeder, an electrical wiring circuit in a building that carries power from a transformer or switchgear to a distribution panel
- Feeder, a circuit conductor between the power supply source and a final branch circuit over current device

== Telecommunication ==
- Feeder link, a radio link from an earth station at a given location to a space station (up-link), or vice versa (down-link)
- Feeder line (network), a branch line of a communications or other network
- Leaky feeder, a communications system used in underground mining and other tunnel environments

== Entertainment ==
- Feeder (band), a Welsh rock group
- Feeders (film), a 1996 American science fiction horror film
- "The Feeder", story by Mildred Cram adapted to film as Behind the Make-Up in 1930
- Feeder club, another name for a farm team
- Feeder formula, in formula racing

== Other ==
- Feeder, a software application for creating, editing and publishing RSS feeds on Mac OS X
- Feeder (fetish), someone who gains sexual pleasure from helping another gain weight
- Feeder Airlines
- Feeder band, a band of squall-like winds and rain on the outside of a tropical cyclone
- Feeder bluff, in geography
- Feeder fund, an investment fund which does almost all of its investments through a master fund via a master-feeder relationship
- Feeder school
- Feeder (casting), another name for a riser, a reservoir built into a metal casting mold to prevent cavities due to shrinkage
- Feeder, a frontage road or other small road eventually delivering traffic to a larger one
- Feeder, a character who dies repeatedly in video game terminology

== See also ==
- Feed (disambiguation)
