= Track technology =

Track technology is an industrial material handling system which uses linear motors to move material along a track. It has been variously termed a smart conveyance system, intelligent track system, industrial transport system, independent cart technology, smart carriage technology, linear or extended or flexible transport system, or simply a conveyor or conveyance platform. They are also referred to simply as linear motors or long stator linear motors, reflecting the underlying technology of the track (stator) and shuttles.

== List of commercially available track systems ==
The following is a list of commercially available track systems by product name:

- ACOPOStrak from B&R Industrial Automation
- ActiveMover from Bosch Rexroth
- iTRAK from Rockwell Automation
- LCM100 and LCM100-X from Yamaha
- Linear Motion System
- Linear Transfer System
- MagneMover LITE from Rockwell Automation
- Multi Carrier System
- Quickstick and Quickstick HT from Rockwell Automation
- SuperTrak Conveyance from ATS Automation Tooling Systems
- SuperTrak from B&R
- XTS from Beckhoff

== Technology adoption and maturity ==
- ATS Automation was the first to utilize linear motor based conveyance with its SuperTrak Conveyance technology. The first commercial system was shipped in 2002.
- According to Packaging World magazine in a January 2018 article, adoption of the technology continues to grow with a third generation of the technology reaching maturity. The article cites freedom from mechanical constraints, shortening changeovers and smaller machine footprints as reasons.
- Track technology itself is not new. For example, Magnemotion (now part of Rockwell Automation) was founded in 1996, and they were not the first to develop the technology.
- In a 2007 technical paper, MagneMotion explained the principles of operation, which they describe as a linear synchronous motor.
- A 2014 case study article described the system's application in medical device assembly.
- A 2013 case study described the use of ATS Automation's SuperTrak system in a flexible cartoning machine used in packaging lines.
- This article, also from 2013, describes early packaging applications and principles of operation for track technology.
- This article described a number of food processing applications, including the automation of labor-intensive tasks such as lasagna production. It also mentions a unique capability to prevent containers of liquids from sloshing, by matching the frequency of a shuttle's motion to the frequency that causes the sloshing.
- This article summarized the activities of major players in track technology as of July 2018.

== Areas of application ==
Track technology is – among other technologies like machine vision and robotics – one of the key enablers for the adaptive machine.

The concept of the adaptive machine also goes beyond track technology to achieve their high levels of flexibility. One complementary technology is the industrial robot, which by definition possesses the same programmable flexibility. Of particular interest is the ability of both robots and track systems to operate safely along with humans in a collaborative environment. This recent development allows for a combination of manual and automated assembly tasks, maintenance and materials replenishment without stopping production.

Machine vision can play a pivotal role when integrated into an adaptive machine. Vision can identify individual shuttles and their contents in order to guide them to the appropriate workstations. Vision has long been used to automate robot guidance, inspection, orientation and related tasks.

Given the adaptive machine's flexibility to respond to consumer demand generation, Internet of Things and e-commerce technologies are complementary, providing the connection between internal production resources and commercial systems in a manufacturer's digital business model.
