= Vibrator (mechanical) =

Mechanical device to generate vibrations

A vibrator is a mechanical device to generate vibrations. The vibration is often generated by an electric motor with an unbalanced mass on its driveshaft.

There are many different types of vibrator. Typically, they are components of larger products such as smartphones, pagers, or video game controllers with a "rumble" feature.

== Vibrators as components ==
When smartphones and pagers vibrate, the vibrating alert is produced by a small component that is built into the phone or pager. Many older, non-electronic buzzers and doorbells contain a component that vibrates for the purpose of producing a sound. Tattoo machines and some types of electric engraving tools contain a mechanism that vibrates a needle or cutting tool. Aircraft stick shakers use a vibrating mechanism attached to the pilots' control yokes to provide a tactile warning of an impending aerodynamic stall. Eccentric rotating mass (ERM) vibrators work by rotating a deliberately unbalanced weight, so the weight is eccentric. Linear resonant actuators (LRAs) work by repeatedly moving a weight from one side of the actuator to another, using a coil acting as an electromagnet. Coin vibration motors have the shape of a coin and are often of the ERM type, working with an axial flux motor.

== Industrial vibrators ==
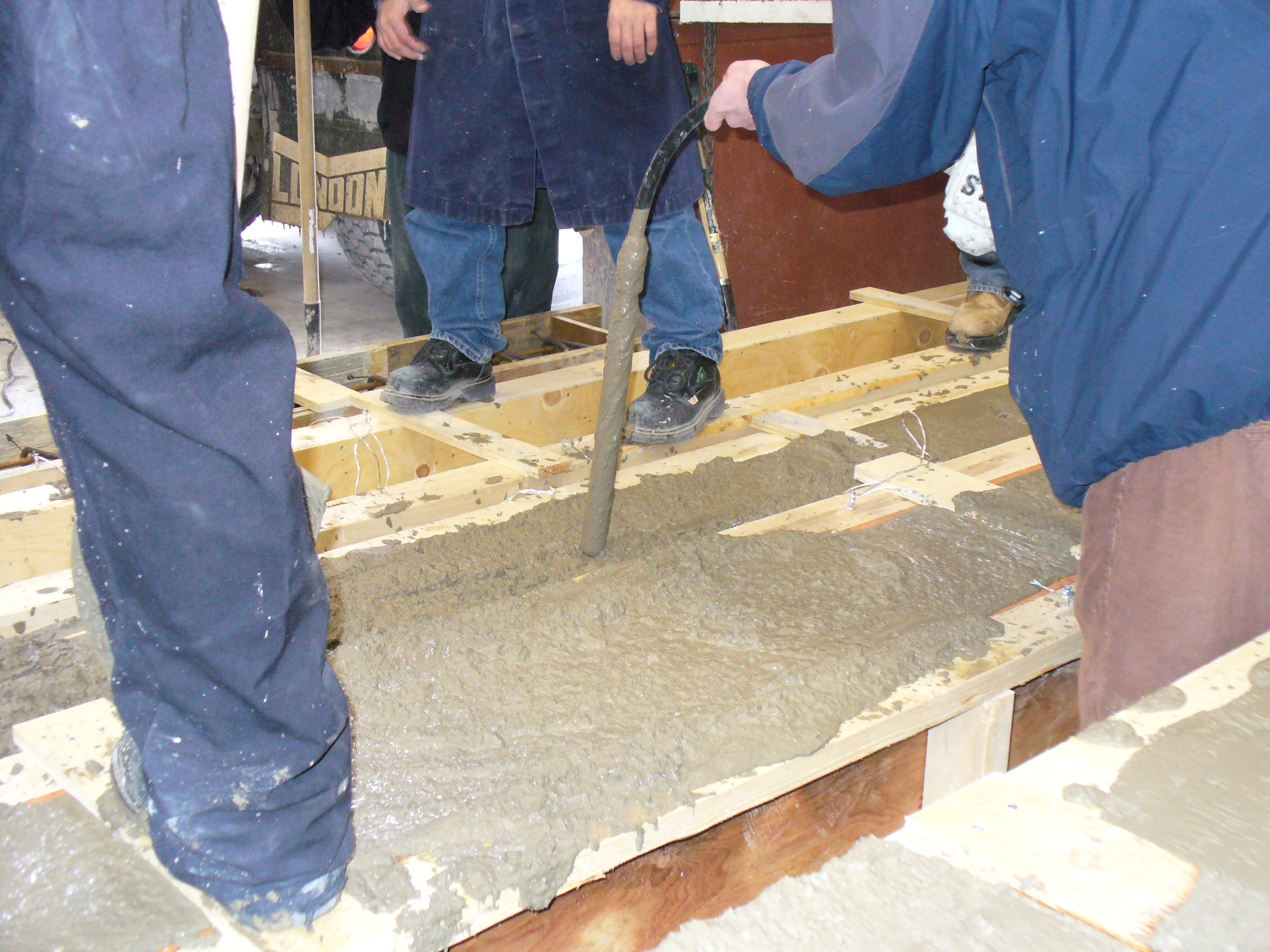
A handheld concrete vibrator consolidates fresh concrete in wooden formwork for a concrete beam.

Handheld concrete vibrator removing air bubbles from still liquid concrete.

Vibrators are used in many different industrial applications both as components and as individual pieces of equipment.

Bowl feeders, vibratory feeders and vibrating hoppers are used extensively in the food, pharmaceutical, and chemical industries to move and position bulk material or small component parts. The application of vibration working with the force of gravity can often move materials through a process more effectively than other methods. Vibration is often used to position small components so that they can be gripped mechanically by automated equipment as required for assembly etc.

Vibrating screens are used to separate bulk materials in a mixture of different sized particles. For example, sand, gravel, river rock and crushed rock, and other aggregates are often separated by size using vibrating screens.

Vibrating compactors are used for soil compaction especially in foundations for roads, railways, and buildings.

Concrete vibrators consolidate freshly poured concrete so that trapped air and excess water are released and the concrete settles firmly in place in the formwork. Improper consolidation of concrete can cause product defects, compromise the concrete strength, and produce surface blemishes such as bug holes and honeycombing. An internal concrete vibrator is a steel cylinder about the size of the handle of a baseball bat, with a hose or electrical cord attached to one end. The vibrator head is immersed in the wet concrete.

External concrete vibrators attach, via a bracket or clamp system, to the concrete forms. There are a wide variety of external concrete vibrators available and some vibrator manufacturers have bracket or clamp systems designed to fit the major brands of concrete forms. External concrete vibrators are available in hydraulic, pneumatic or electric power.

Vibrating tables or shake tables are sometimes used to test products to determine or demonstrate their ability to withstand vibration. Testing of this type is commonly done in the automotive, aerospace, and defense industries. These machines are capable of producing three different types of vibration profile sine sweep, random vibration, and synthesized shock. In all three of these applications, the part under test will typically be instrumented with one or more accelerometers to measure component response to the vibration input. A sine sweep vibration profile typically starts vibrating at low frequency and increases in frequency at a set rate (measured in hertz). The vibratory amplitude as measured in gs may increase or decrease as well. A sine sweep will find resonant frequencies in the part. A random vibration profile will excite different frequencies along a spectrum at different times. Significant calculation goes into making sure that all frequencies get excited to within an acceptable tolerance band. A random vibration test suite may range anywhere from 30 seconds up to several hours. It is intended to synthesize the effect of, for example, a car driving over rough terrain or a rocket taking off. A synthesized shock pulse is a short duration high level vibration calculated as a sum of many half-sine waves covering a range of frequencies. It is intended to simulate the effects of an impact or explosion. A shock pulse test typically lasts less than a second. Vibrating tables can also be used in the packaging process in material handling industries to shake or settle a container so it can hold more product.
