= List of feeding behaviours =

Circular dendrogram of feeding behaviours

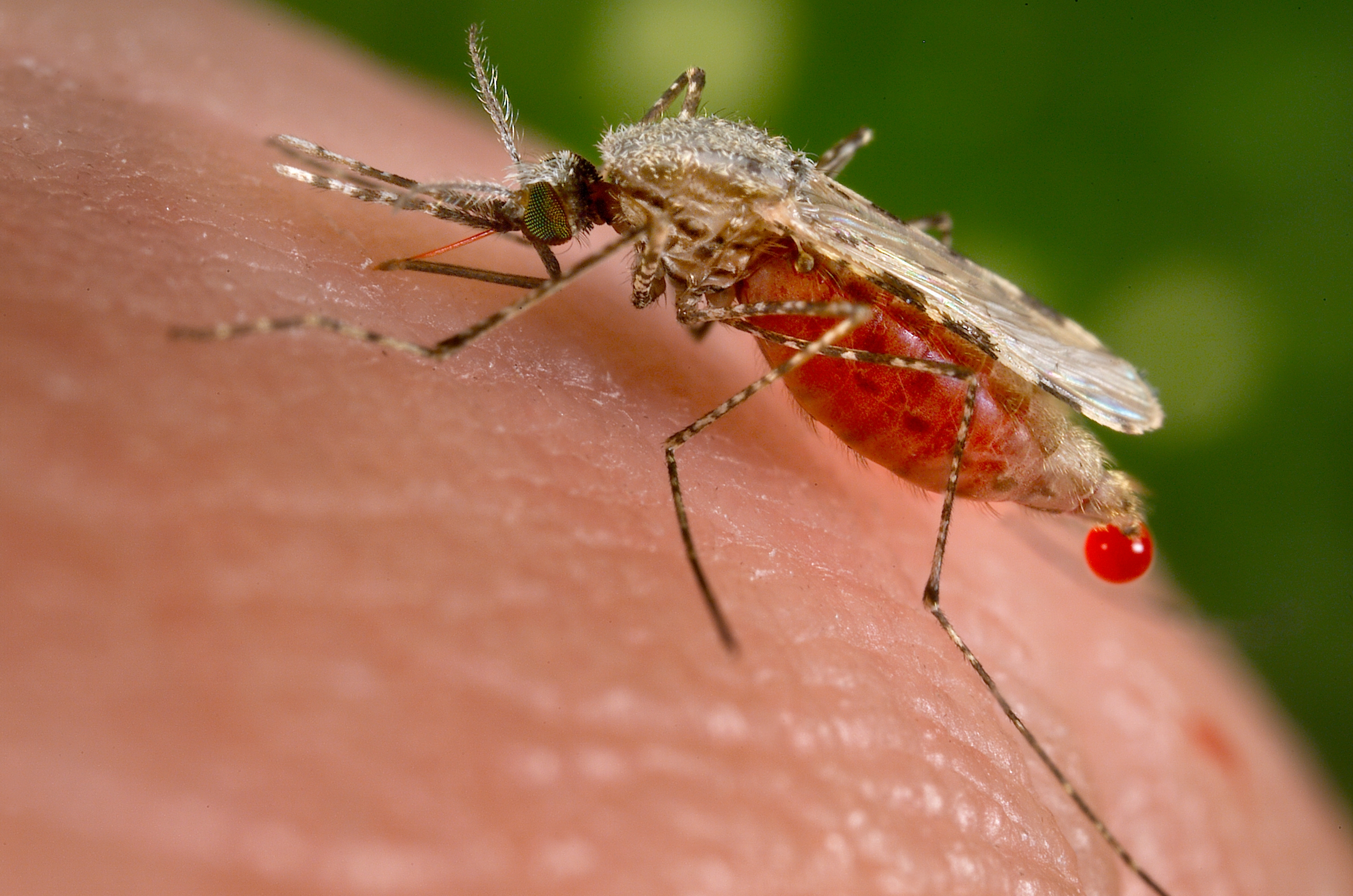
A mosquito drinking blood (hematophagy) from a human (note the droplet of plasma being expelled as a waste)

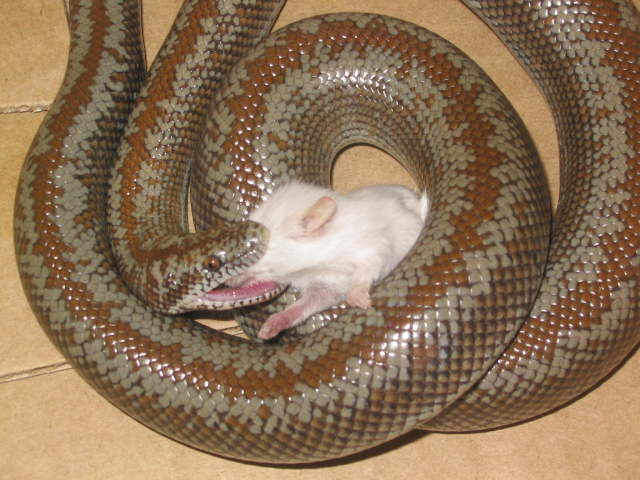
A rosy boa eating a mouse whole

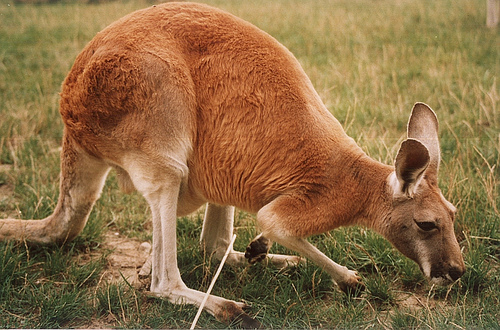
A red kangaroo eating grass

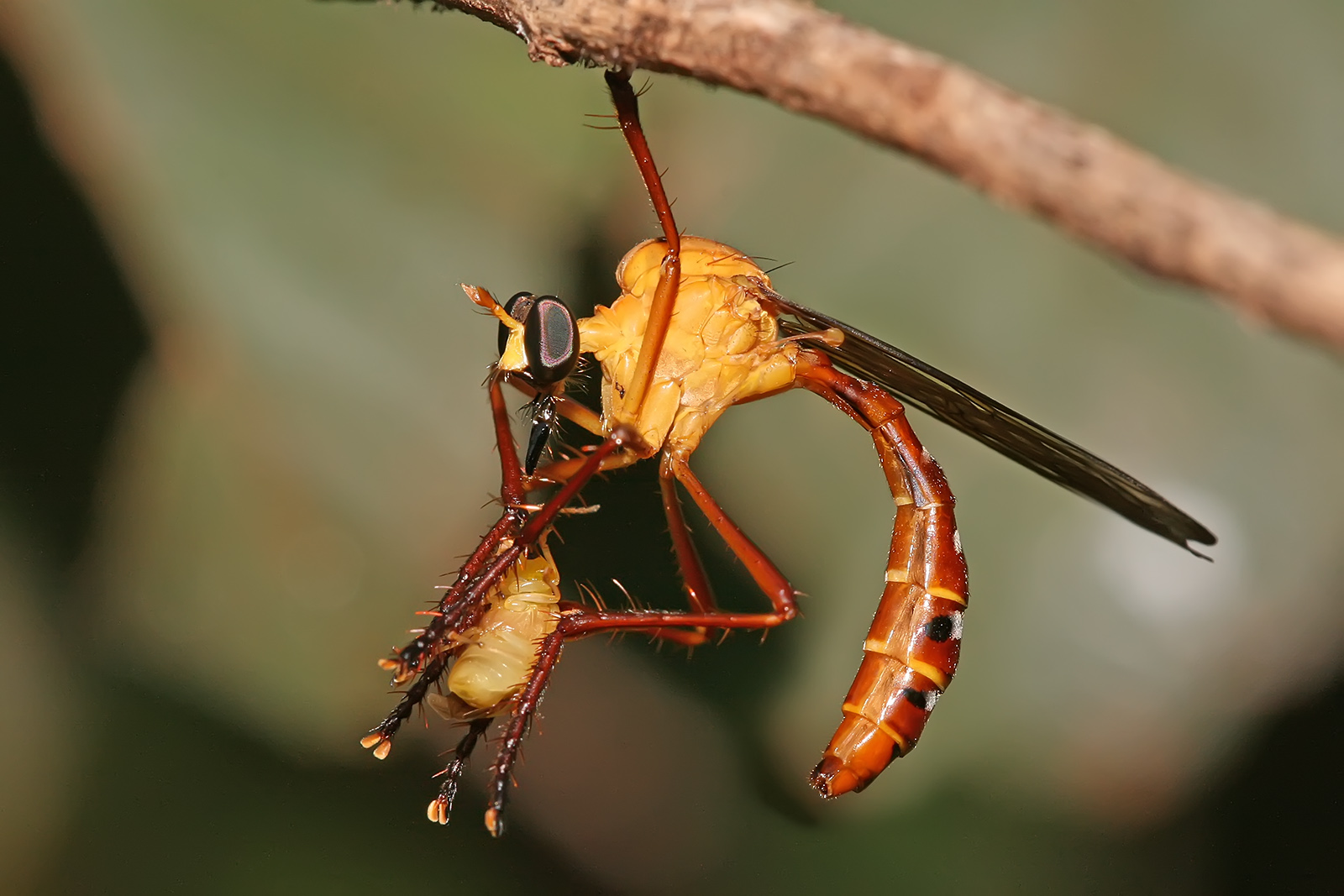
The robberfly is an insectivore, shown here having grabbed a leaf beetle

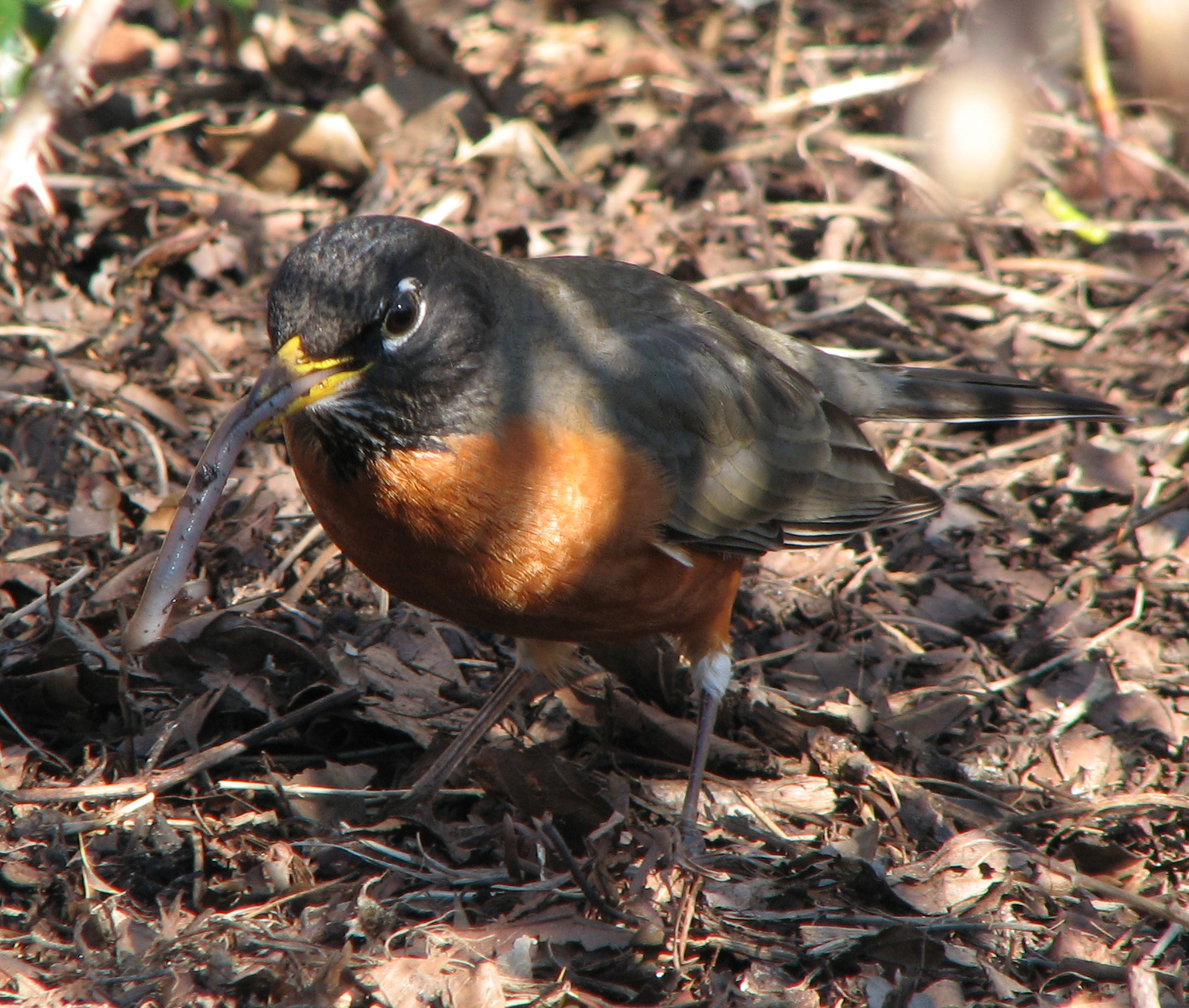
An American robin eating a worm

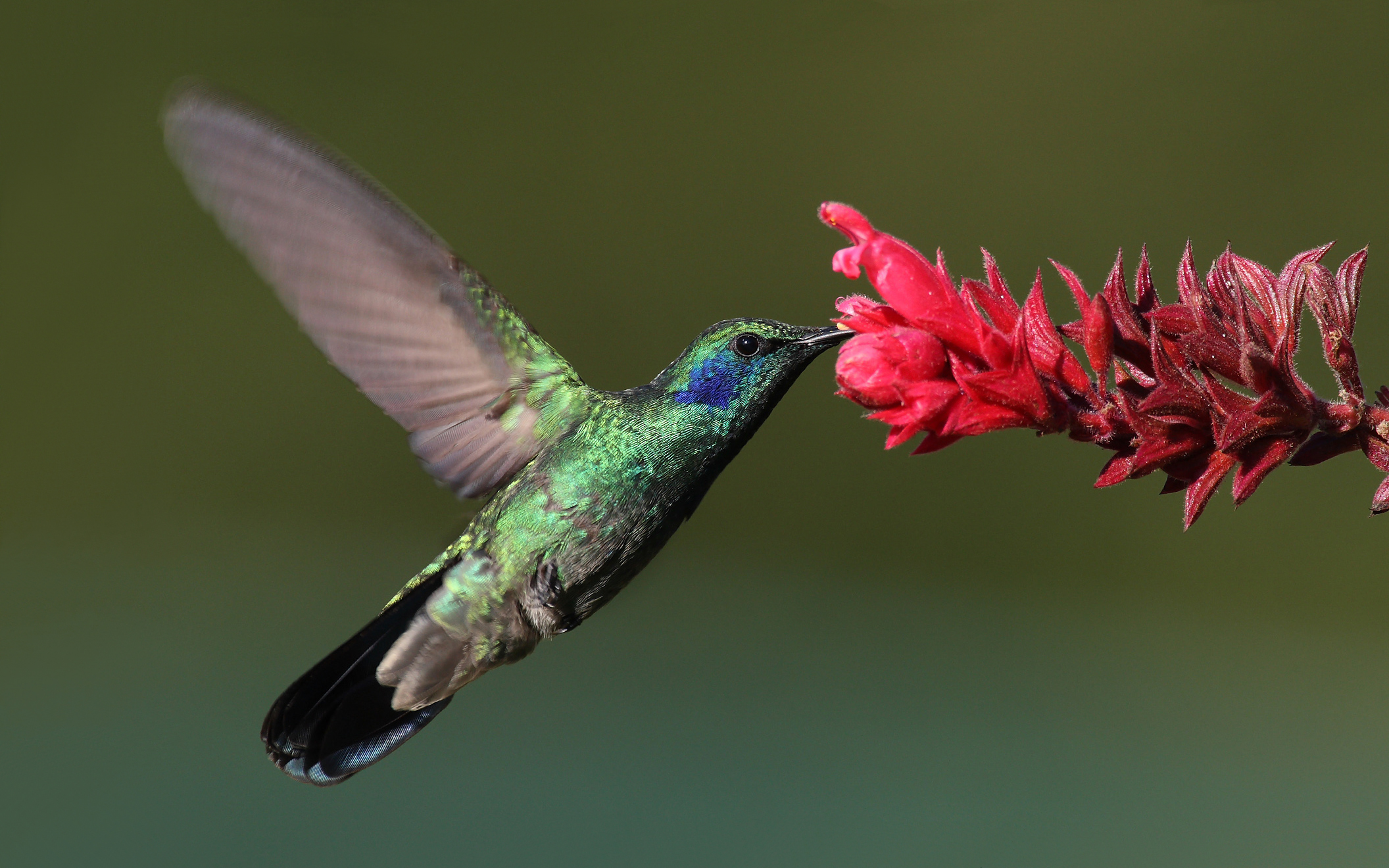
Hummingbirds primarily drink nectar

A krill filter feeding

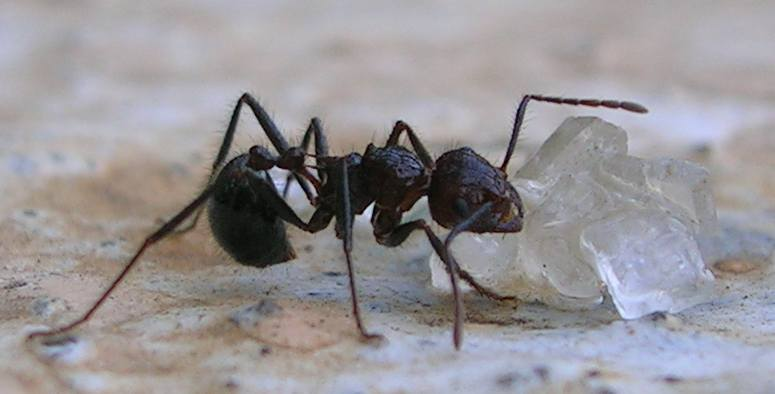
A Myrmicaria brunnea feeding on sugar crystals

Feeding is the process by which organisms, typically animals, obtain food. Terminology often uses either the suffixes -vore, -vory, or -vorous from Latin vorare, meaning "to devour", or -phage, -phagy, or -phagous from Greek φαγεῖν (phagein), meaning "to eat".

== Evolutionary history ==
The evolution of feeding is varied with some feeding strategies evolving several times in independent lineages. In terrestrial vertebrates, the earliest forms were large amphibious piscivores 400 million years ago. While amphibians continued to feed on fish and later insects, reptiles began exploring two new food types, other tetrapods (carnivory), and later, plants (herbivory). Carnivory was a natural transition from insectivory for medium and large tetrapods, requiring minimal adaptation (in contrast, a complex set of adaptations was necessary for feeding on highly fibrous plant materials).

== Classification ==
=== By mode of ingestion ===
Modes of feeding include:

- Filter feeding: a form of food procurement in which food particles or small organisms are randomly strained from water
- Deposit feeding: obtaining nutrients from particles suspended in soil
- Fluid feeding: obtaining nutrients by consuming other organisms' fluids
- Predation: obtaining nutrients by eating all of an organism
- Ram feeding and suction feeding: ingesting prey via the fluids around it

=== By mode of digestion ===
- Extra-cellular digestion: excreting digesting enzymes and then reabsorbing the products
- Myzocytosis: one cell pierces another using a feeding tube, and sucks out cytoplasm
- Phagocytosis: engulfing food matter into living cells, where it is digested

=== By food type ===
Polyphagy is the habit in an animal species, of eating and tolerating a relatively wide variety of foods, whereas monophagy is the intolerance of every food except for one specific type (see generalist and specialist species). Oligophagy is a term for intermediate degrees of selectivity, referring to animals that eat a relatively small range of foods, either because of preference or necessity.

Another classification refers to the specific food animals specialize in eating, such as:

- Carnivore: the eating of animals
  - Araneophagy: eating spiders
  - Avivore: eating birds
  - Corallivore: eating coral
  - Durophagy: eating hard-shelled or exoskeleton bearing organisms
  - Egg predator: eating eggs (but also see "Intrauterine cannibalism" below), also Ovivore
  - Haematophage/Sanguivore: eating blood
  - Insectivore: eating insects
    - Myrmecophage: eating ants and/or termites
  - Invertivore: eating invertebrates
  - Keratophagy or Ceratophagy: eating keratin-based material, such as wool by cloths moths, or snakes eating their own skin after ecdysis.
  - Lepidophagy: eating fish scales
  - Molluscivore: eating molluscs
  - Mucophagy: eating mucus
  - Ophiophagy: eating snakes
  - Piscivore: eating fish
  - Anurophagy: eating frogs
  - Spongivore: eating sponges
  - Teuthophagore: eating mainly squid and other cephalopods
  - Vermivore: eating worms
  - Zooplanktonivore: eating zooplankton
- Herbivore: the eating of plants
  - Exudativore: eating plant and/or insect exudates (gum, sap, lerp, etc.)
    - Gummivore: eating tree sap or gum
  - Folivore: eating leaves
  - Florivore: eating flower tissue prior to seed coat formation
  - Frugivore: eating fruits
  - Graminivore: eating grasses
  - Granivore: eating seeds
  - Nectarivore: eating nectar
  - Palynivore: eating pollen
  - Xylophage: eating wood
- Algivore: eating algae (both macroalgae and microalgae)
  - Phytoplanktonivore: eating phytoplankton
- Omnivore: the eating of both plants, animals, fungi, bacteria etc. The term means "all-eater".
- By amount of meat in diet
  - Hypercarnivore: more than 70% meat
  - Mesocarnivore: 30–70% meat
  - Hypocarnivore: less than 30% meat
- Fungivore: the eating of fungus
- Bacterivore: the eating of bacteria

The eating of non-living or decaying matter:

- Coprophage: eating faeces
- Detritivore: eating particulate decaying organic matter
- Geophagia: eating inorganic earth
- Necrophage: eating carrion
- Osteophage: eating bones
- Saprophage: eating or metabolising decaying organic matter
- Scavenger: eating carrion, refuse or other decaying organic matter

There are also several unusual feeding behaviours, either normal, opportunistic, or pathological, such as:

- Cannibalism: feeding on members of the same species
  - Anthropophagy: the practice of eating human flesh
  - Autocannibalism: feeding on parts of one's own body (see also autophagy)
  - Filial cannibalism
  - Intrauterine cannibalism
    - Oophagy or ovophagy: the embryo/foetus eats sibling eggs
    - Embryophagy: the foetus eats sibling embryos
  - Sexual cannibalism: cannibalism after mating
- Kleptoparasitism: stealing food from another animal
- Kleptopharmacophagy: act of stealing chemical compounds for consumption
- Lignophagia: eating wood, typically a pathological condition in some domestic animals
- Paedophagy: eating young animals
- Pica: appetite for largely non-nutritive substances, e.g. clay or hair, sometimes in pregnancy or in pathological states, typically a medical or veterinary concern.
- Placentophagy: eating placenta
- Trophallaxis: eating food regurgitated by another animal
- Zoopharmacognosy: self-medication by eating plants, soils, and insects to treat and prevent disease

An opportunistic feeder sustains itself from a number of different food sources, because the species is behaviourally sufficiently flexible.

== Storage behaviours ==
Some animals exhibit hoarding and caching behaviours in which they store or hide food for later use.

== See also ==
- Consumer-resource systems
- Dinosaur diet and feeding
- List of abnormal behaviours in animals
- Ingestive behaviors — The physiological behaviors of feeding
