= Blisk =

Bladed disk; machine part

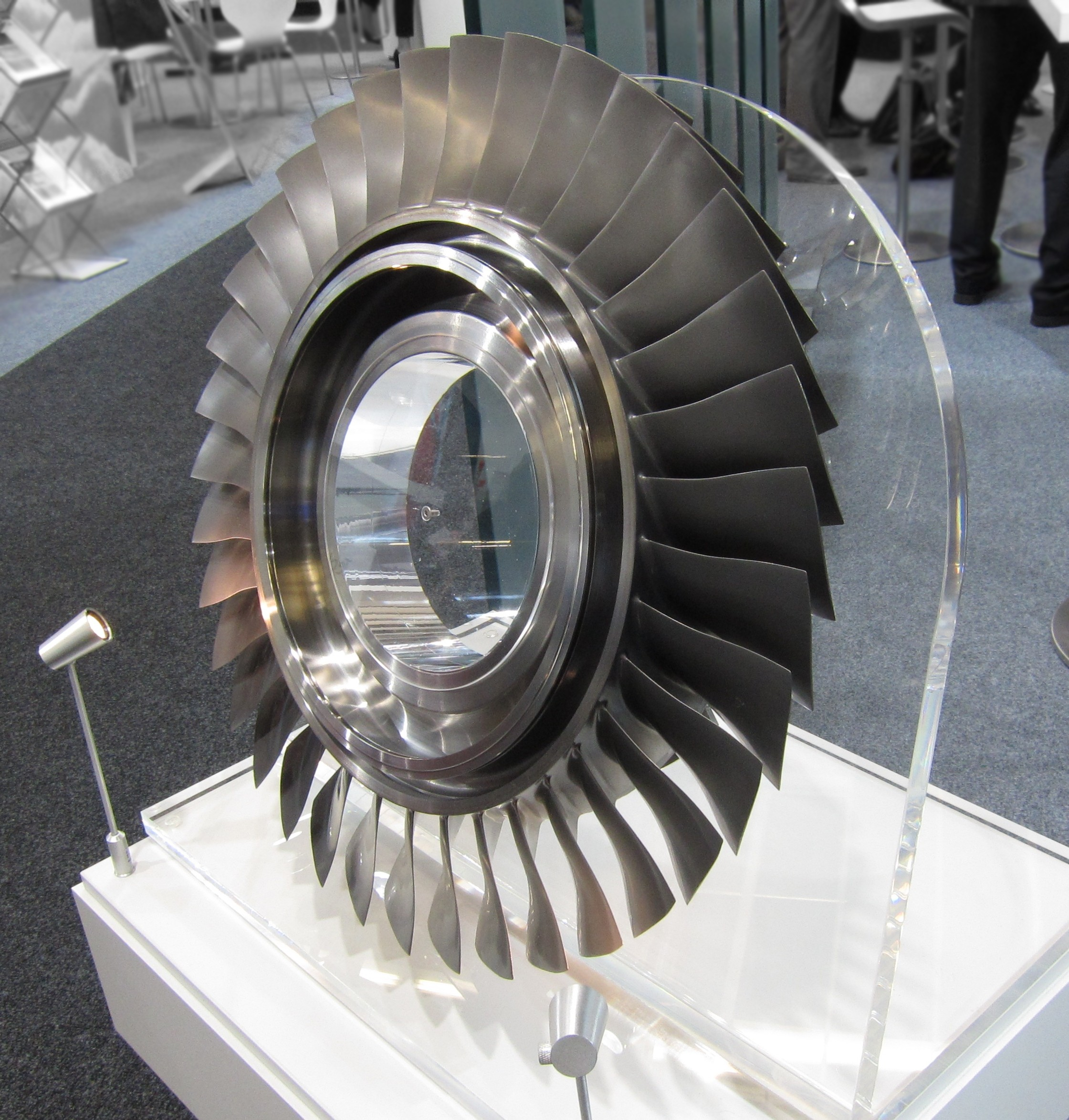
A CNC-milled, single piece axial compressor blisk

A blisk (portmanteau of bladed disk), also known as an integrally bladed rotor (IBR), is a turbomachinery component consisting of a rotor disk and blades made as a single part instead of a disk assembled with individual removable blades. Blisks generally have superior aerodynamics than conventional rotors with single blades and are lighter. They may be made by additive manufacturing, casting, machining from a solid piece of material, or welding blades to a rotor disk. The term blisk is used mainly in aerospace engine design.

== History ==
Blisks have been manufactured since the mid-1980s. It was first used by Sermatech–Lehr (now known as GKN Aerospace) in 1985 for the compressors of the T700 helicopter engine. Since then, its use has continued to increase in major applications for both compressors and fan blade rotors. Examples include the Rocketdyne RS-68 rocket engine and the General Electric F110 turbofan.

The B variant of the Lockheed Martin F-35 Lightning II uses blisks to achieve short take-off and vertical landing.

Engine manufacturer CFM International is using blisks in the compressor section of its LEAP-X demonstrator engine program, which has completed full-scale rig testing. The compressor sections of PowerJet SaM146 engines which power Sukhoi Superjet 100 aircraft are also equipped with blisks.

General Electric's Passport (formerly "TechX") engine uses blisks for both its main 52 in (130 cm) fan as well as for five of its ten high pressure compressor stages. The GEnx engines already use blisks in some stages.

== Advantages ==
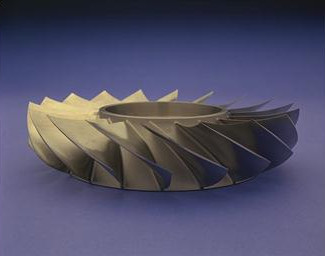
A blisk used in a gas turbine engine compressor.

Instead of making bare compressor disks and attaching the blades later, blisks are single elements combining the two. This eliminates the need to attach the blades to the disk (via screws, bolts, etc.), thus decreasing the number of components in the compressor, while at the same time decreasing drag and increasing efficiency of air compression in the engine. The elimination of the dovetail attachment found on traditional rotors also eliminates a source for fatigue crack initiation and subsequent propagation.

Efficiency improvements of up to 8% are possible.

== Disadvantages ==
Any damage to blades on integrally bladed rotors beyond minor dents and scratches requires the rotor to be replaced, or for the damaged blades to be cut off and replacement blades welded on. Maintenance of this nature is often extremely difficult to perform on the flightline and often requires the engine or compressor to be fully removed and sent to a repair facility. Integrally bladed rotors must also undergo much more rigorous harmonic vibration testing and dynamic balancing than traditional rotors, since the inherent natural damping that traditional rotors' dovetail attachments provide is no longer present.

== Process ==
=== General ===
Blisks can be produced with several different manufacturing processes, including CNC milling, investment casting, electrochemical machining, 3D printing, or welding. Research is being conducted to produce them using friction welding of "near net" part shapes that are then machined down to the final blisk shape.

=== Measurement and inspection ===
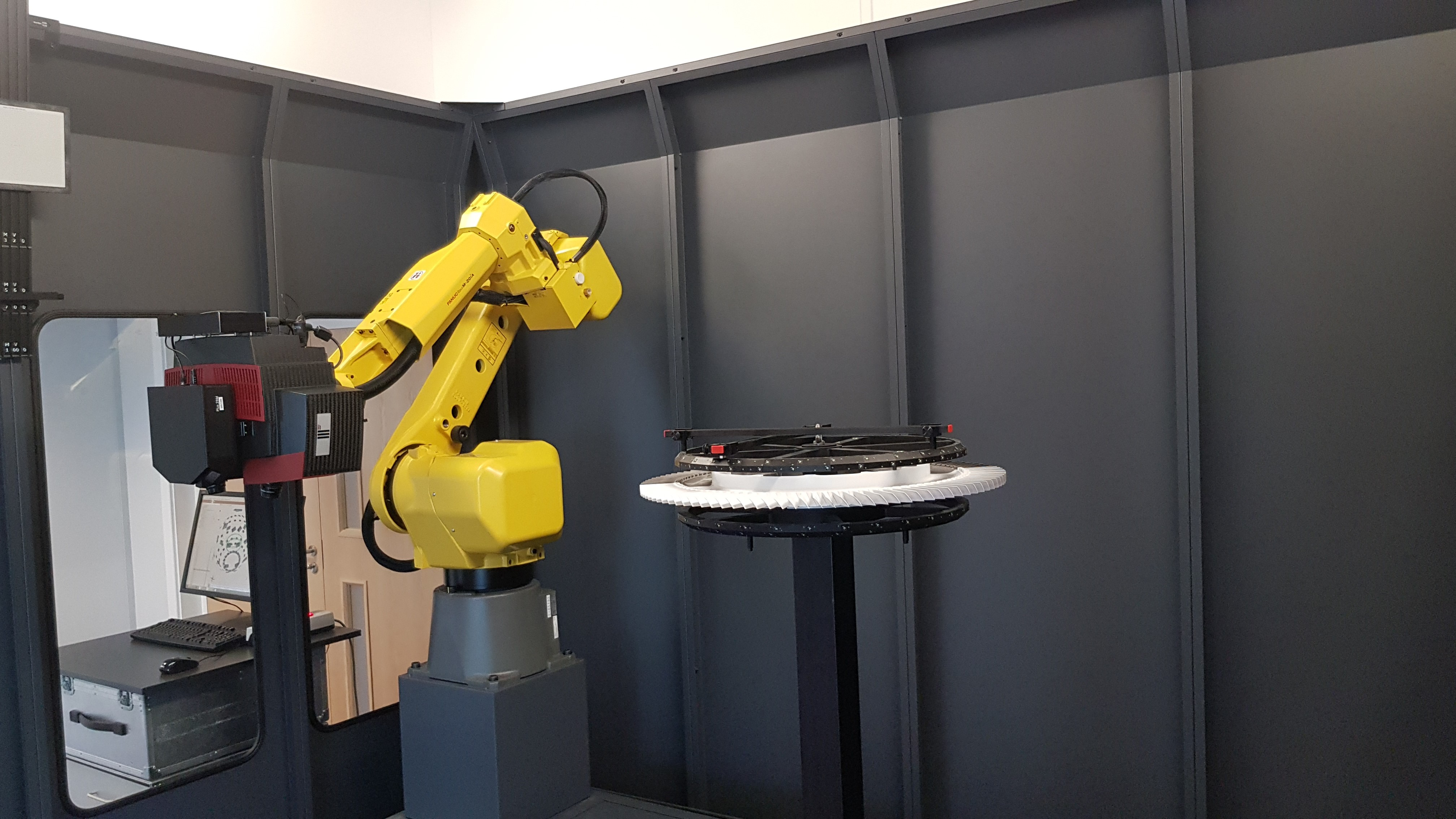
Sample blisk in ATOS ScanBox

The measurement and inspection of blisks, crucial for guaranteeing engine performance, is carried out at the end of the manufacturing processes. Traditionally this has been achieved using tactile devices, like coordinate-measuring machines (CMM), but as geometries and requirements increase, the trend in modern factories is to carry out 3D scanning inspection systems. This has advantages of the speed of measurement compared to tactile devices, whilst collecting 3D data to relate back to design characteristics. Using 3D data, parts can be catalogued in this way, often called digital twin, allowing monitoring of the product through its life-cycle.

=== Blisk repair using adaptive machining ===
Engine-run blisks pose their own set of unique requirements. After parts have been in service in the engine, noticeable amounts of damage and wear will be observed. Provided that the damage and wear are within thresholds set by the design authority, it is possible that the blisks can be repaired.

Repair of blisk components is very complex and first requires an accurate 3D representation of the component. The quickest way to do this is by 3D scanning the product. After the part is scanned, an STL file (stereolithograph) can be passed to a CNC code generating software such as NX CAM. The tool paths are regenerated to suit the measured geometry and not the nominally generated CAD in a process known as adaptive machining.

The processes would typically involve removing part or all of a blade(s), followed by a weld back to approximate size before finishing by final machining back to the airfoil shape.
