= Feed =

Feed or The Feed may refer to:

== Animal foodstuffs ==
- Animal feed, food given to domestic animals in the course of animal husbandry
  - Fodder, foodstuffs manufactured for animal consumption
  - Forage, foodstuffs that animals gather themselves, such as by grazing
- Compound feed, foodstuffs that are blended from various raw materials and additives

== Arts, entertainment, and media ==
=== Film ===
- Feed (1992 film), a film directed by Kevin Rafferty
- Feed (2005 film), a film directed by Brett Leonard
- Feed (2017 film), a film directed by Tommy Bertelsen
- Feed (2022 film), a Swedish horror film

=== Literature ===
- Feed (Anderson novel), a 2002 novel by M. T. Anderson
- Feed (Grant novel), a 2010 novel by Seanan McGuire under the name "Mira Grant"

=== Music ===
- "Feed Us", 2007 song by Serj Tankian from Elect the Dead
- "Feed", 2022 song by Demi Lovato from Holy Fvck

=== Online media ===
- Feed Magazine, one of the earliest e-zines that relied entirely on its original online content
- "The Feed", video game news and blogs, published by G4 Media, an NBCUniversal subsidiary
- Web feed or news feed, a data format used for providing users with frequently updated content
  - Feed (Facebook), a web feed on the social networking site

=== Television ===
- The Feed (Australian TV series), an Australian news TV series
- The Feed (British TV series), a 2019 psychological thriller drama television series
- The Feed, a recurring segment on the American TV series Attack of the Show!

=== Other arts and media ===
- A straight man who 'feeds' lines to the funny man in a comic dialogue
- In video game terminology, when a player's character repeatedly dies in-game in a way that benefits an opponent or opposing team.

== Computing and telecommunications ==
- Antenna feed, the components of an antenna which feed the radio waves to the rest of the antenna structure
- Data feed, a mechanism for users to receive updates from data sources
  - Web feed
    - feed URI scheme (feed:), a non-standard URI scheme designed to facilitate subscription to web feeds
- Relay (disambiguation), any of several technologies for forwarding messages between stations
  - Feed, a broadcasting signal sent from one station to another, or to or from a central facility, intended for retransmission

== Science and technology ==
- The liquid input into a filtration is called the feed
- Speeds and feeds

== See also ==
- FEED (disambiguation)
- Feeder (disambiguation)
- Feeding (disambiguation)
