= Eat (disambiguation) =

Eating is the process of consuming food for the purpose of providing for the nutritional needs of an animal.

Eat or EAT may also refer to:

== Music ==
- Eat (band), a British independent rock band active 1986–1995
- Eat (album), a 2026 album by Brooke Fraser
- Eat, 1998 album by Charming Hostess
- Eat (NXT Soundtrack) an EP by Poppy

== Television ==
- E.A.T. (TV program), a Philippine TV variety show
- "Eat" (Yo Gabba Gabba!), an episode
- Eat: The Story of Food, 2014 American documentary television series
- Ehime Asahi Television, a television station in Ehime Prefecture, Japan

== Other uses ==
- Eat (restaurant), a UK sandwich shop chain
- Eat (film), an underground film created by Andy Warhol

== Acronyms and codes ==
=== Automotive ===
- Electronic automatic transmission, a type of vehicle automatic transmission

=== Healthcare ===
- Eating Attitudes Test
- Ectopic atrial tachycardia, an abnormal heart condition

=== Organizations ===
- Emergency Action Team, the SWAT team in the American television series Hill Street Blues
- Employment Appeal Tribunal, in Britain
- Experiments in Art and Technology

=== Transportation ===
- European Air Transport (Belgium), a defunct airline for DHL
- European Air Transport Leipzig, a German parcel-carrier airline for DHL
- Pangborn Memorial Airport, Washington state, US, IATA code
- International vehicle registration code for East Africa Tanzania

=== Other acronyms and codes ===
- e.a.t., et aliis titulis (Latin for and other titles)
- East Africa Time
- Export Address Table, a dynamic-link library term for its structure of descriptors
- Emergency Action Termination, a discontinued “and unused” code that would have been used to end Emergency Action Notification alerts from the Emergency Alert System.

== See also ==
- EATS (disambiguation)
- Eating (disambiguation)
- Eat Me (disambiguation)
- Eat This, Not That
