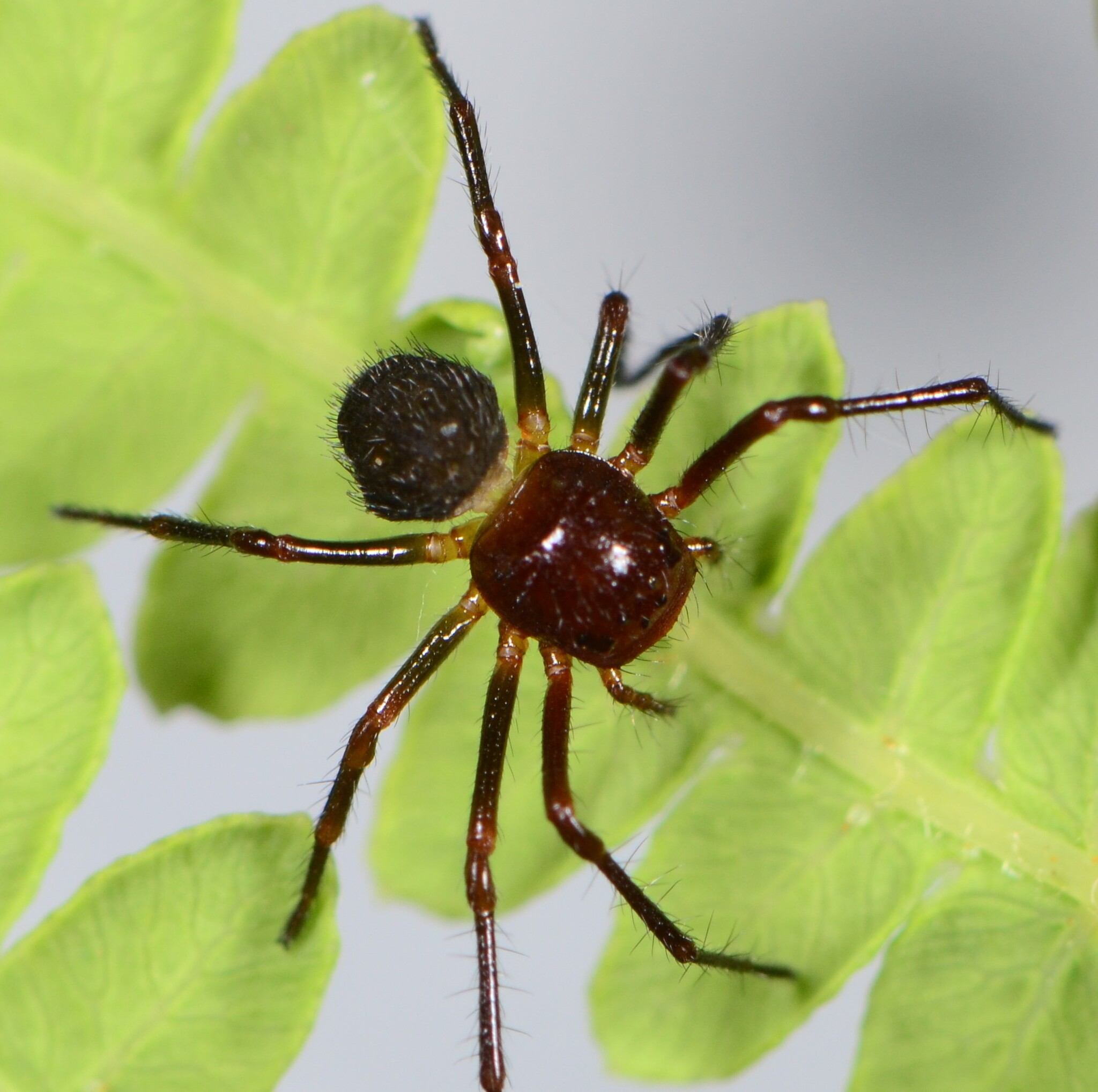
- female
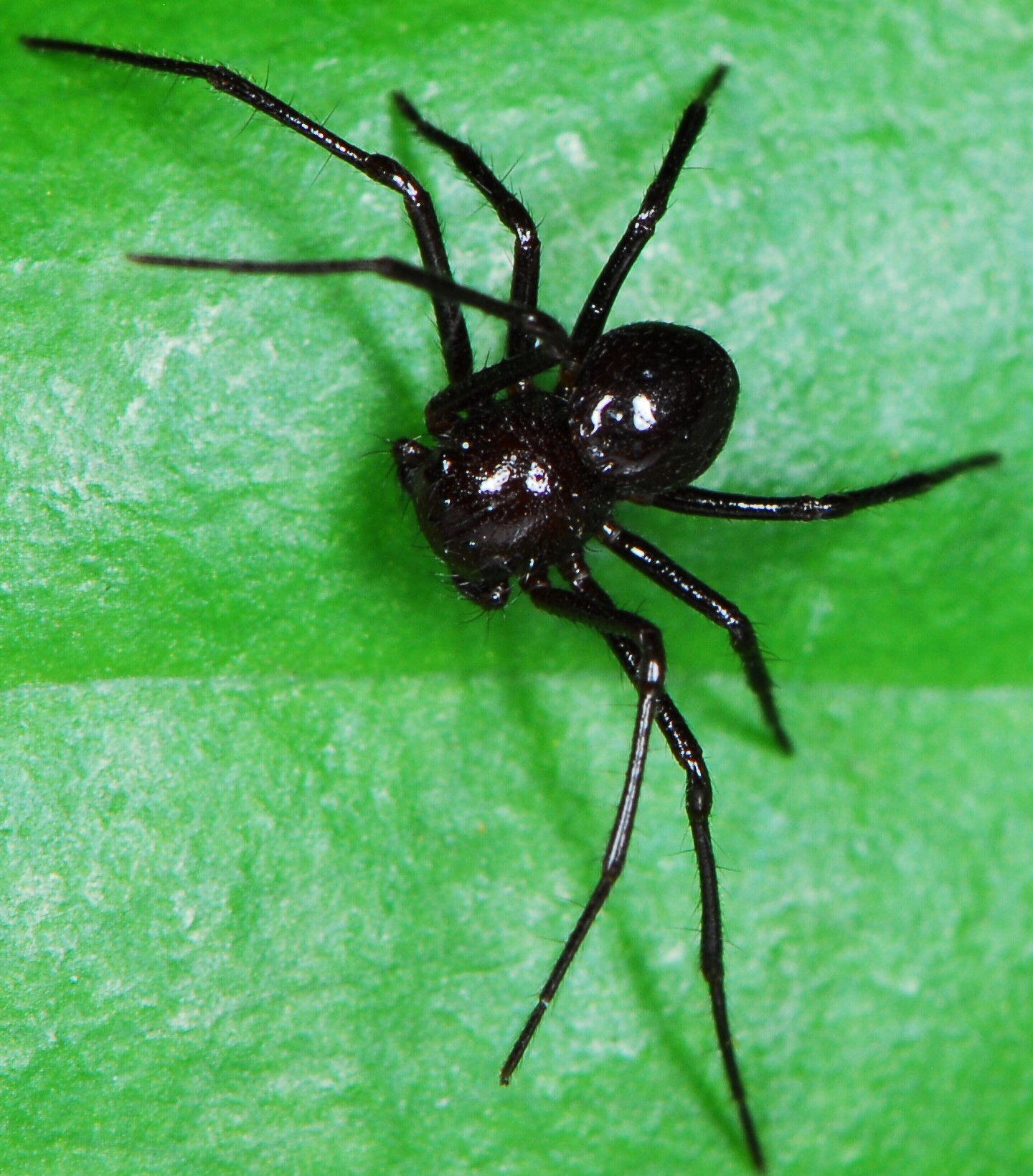
- female

Scientific classification
- Kingdom: Animalia
- Phylum: Arthropoda
- Subphylum: Chelicerata
- Class: Arachnida
- Order: Araneae
- Infraorder: Araneomorphae
- Family: Thomisidae
- Genus: Sylligma
- Species: S. ndumi

Binomial name
- Sylligma ndumi Lewis & Dippenaar-Schoeman, 2011

= Sylligma ndumi =

Ndumo ant-eating crab spider

Species of spider

Sylligma ndumi is a species of crab spider of the genus Sylligma. It is native to southern Africa, where it has been recorded from Botswana, South Africa, and Eswatini.

== Distribution ==
Sylligma ndumi has been recorded from Botswana, South Africa, and Eswatini. In South Africa, the species is known from Eastern Cape, KwaZulu-Natal, Limpopo, Mpumalanga, and North West Province.

== Habitat ==
Sylligma ndumi is a free-living plant dweller that has been sampled from plants and the ground litter layer in Forest, Indian Ocean Coastal Belt, and Savanna biomes at elevations ranging from 4 to 1,412 m. Specimens have been collected using various methods in savanna, grassland, swamps, riparian forest, and sand forest environments. They are found on the ground in forest undergrowth, leaf litter, and under rocks.

The species feeds on ants. In Ndumo Game Reserve, specimens were observed preying on the ant Myrmicaria natalensis, and similar observations of ant predation have been made at other localities.

== Description ==
Females have a total length of 3.18–4.38 mm, with males slightly smaller at 2.50–3.35 mm.

=== Female ===
The female has a carapace and legs that are shades of pale to dark copper-brown to rich orange-brown, tinged with black. The opisthosoma is sometimes mottled. The carapace is slightly longer than wide with a posterior edge accentuated with tubercles bearing strong setae. The texture is smooth to granular with scattered setae present on the cephalic region.

The epigyne has an atrium with a wave-like rim parallel to the epigastric furrow. The spermatheca are large and kidney-shaped to slightly elongate.

=== Male ===
Males are similar to females but often darker in coloration. The carapace has a rounder shape when viewed from above with a smooth texture and vertical clypeus. The opisthosoma bears a scutum with few fine, short, and adpressed setae.

The male pedipalp has a short, strongly sclerotized embolus with a thin, sharp tip.

== Etymology ==
The species is named after the type locality, Ndumo Game Reserve in KwaZulu-Natal Province, South Africa.

== Conservation status ==
Sylligma ndumi is classified as Least Concern due to its wide geographical range. No significant threats have been identified, and the species is protected in several nature reserves and national parks including Enseleni Nature Reserve, Mkuze Game Reserve, Ndumo Game Reserve, Tembe Elephant Park, and Kruger National Park.
