= Consumption =

Consumption may refer to:

- Eating
- Resource consumption
- Tuberculosis, an infectious disease, historically known as consumption
- Consumer (food chain), receipt of energy by consuming other organisms
- Consumption (economics), the purchasing of newly produced goods for current use also defined as the consuming of products
  - Consumption function, an economic formula
- Consumption (sociology) of resources, associated with social class, identity, group membership, and age

== See also ==
- Eating (disambiguation)
- Consumerism
