= Feeder line =

Feeder line may refer to:

- Feeder line (network), a branch line of a communications or other network
- Feeder line development program, a part of the 1980 Staggers Rail Act that allows the Interstate Commerce Commission (now the Surface Transportation Board) to order sale of a line over which inadequate service is being provided
- Feeder line (manufacturing), a secondary assembly line which provides parts used in a primary assembly line
