= Drink Me =

Drink me may refer to:

- "Drink Me" (Batwoman), an episode of Batwoman
- "Drink me", a reference to Alice's Adventures in Wonderland
- Drink Me (Queenadreena album), 2002
- Drink Me (Poisoned Electrick Head album)
- Drink Me (Salad album), 1995
- "Drink Me", a song on Anna Nalick's debut album, Wreck of the Day

== See also ==
- Eat Me (disambiguation)
