= EATS =

EATS may refer to:

- Empire Air Training Scheme
- Every Aronszajn tree is special

== See also ==
- EAT (disambiguation)
