= Eater =

Eater may refer to:

- Eater (band), an English punk rock group
- "Eater" (Fear Itself), a 2008 episode of the NBC television horror anthology Fear Itself
- Eater (novel), a 2000 science fiction novel by Gregory Benford
- Eater (website), a daily online culinary news publication from Vox Media

== See also ==
- Eating, the ingestion of food
  - Eating (disambiguation)
- Eaters (disambiguation)
