= Eaters =

Eaters may refer to:

- Eaters, people who eat, see eating
- Geleen Eaters, a professional ice hockey team

== See also ==
- Eater (disambiguation)
