= Feeding (disambiguation) =

Feeding is the process of ingesting food to provide for an animal's nutritional needs.

Feeding may also refer to:

- The Feeding (film), a 2006 horror film
- The Feeding (album), a 2005 album by American Head Charge
- Feeding order, a relation between rules in linguistics

== See also ==
- Eating (disambiguation)
- Feed (disambiguation)
