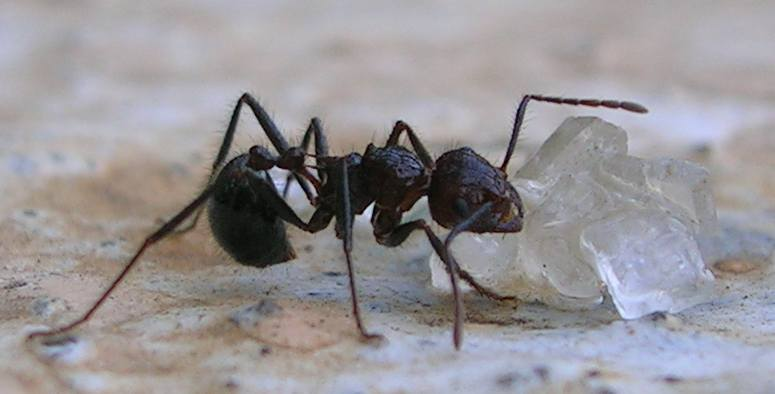
- M. brunnea

Scientific classification
- Domain: Eukaryota
- Kingdom: Animalia
- Phylum: Arthropoda
- Class: Insecta
- Order: Hymenoptera
- Family: Formicidae
- Subfamily: Myrmicinae
- Tribe: Solenopsidini
- Genus: Myrmicaria; Saunders, 1842

Type species
- Myrmicaria brunnea Saunders, 1842

Diversity
- 32 species

Synonyms
- Heptacondylus Smith, 1857; Physatta Smith, 1857

= Myrmicaria =

Genus of ants

Myrmicaria is an ant genus within the subfamily Myrmicinae.

== Description ==
Myrmicaria can be discerned from related ant genera by a postpetiole with a complete tergosternal fusion, a postpetiole-gaster articulation shifted ventrally on the gaster, and an antenna with seven segments.

== Biochemistry ==
Myrmicarin 430A, a heptacyclic alkaloid, was isolated from the poison glands of African Myrmicaria. The structure of its carbon skeleton was previously unknown.

== Species ==
- Myrmicaria anomala Arnold, 1960
- Myrmicaria arachnoides (Smith, 1857)
- Myrmicaria arnoldi Santschi, 1925
- Myrmicaria basutorum Arnold, 1960
- Myrmicaria baumi Forel, 1901
- Myrmicaria birmana Forel, 1902
- Myrmicaria brunnea Saunders, 1842
- Myrmicaria carinata (Smith, 1857)
- Myrmicaria castanea Crawley, 1924
- Myrmicaria distincta Santschi, 1925
- Myrmicaria exigua Andre, 1890
- Myrmicaria faurei Arnold, 1947
- Myrmicaria fodica (Jerdon, 1851)
- Myrmicaria foreli Santschi, 1925
- Myrmicaria fumata Santschi, 1916
- Myrmicaria fusca Stitz, 1911
- Myrmicaria irregularis Santschi, 1925
- Myrmicaria laevior Forel, 1910
- Myrmicaria lutea Emery, 1900
- Myrmicaria melanogaster Emery, 1900
- Myrmicaria natalensis (Smith, 1858)
- Myrmicaria nigra (Mayr, 1862)
- Myrmicaria opaciventris Emery, 1893
- Myrmicaria reichenspergeri Santschi, 1925
- Myrmicaria rhodesiae Arnold, 1958
- Myrmicaria rugosa (Smith, 1860)
- Myrmicaria rustica Santschi, 1925
- Myrmicaria salambo Wheeler, 1922
- Myrmicaria striata Stitz, 1911
- Myrmicaria striatula Santschi, 1925
- Myrmicaria tigreensis (Guerin-Meneville, 1849)
- Myrmicaria vidua Smith, 1858
