= Eating (disambiguation) =

Eating is the ingestion of food.

Eating may also refer to:

- Eating (film), a 1990 American film
- Eating (performance art), a performance by Abel Azcona
- "Eating", a Series E episode of the television series QI (2007)

== See also ==
- Consumption (disambiguation)
- EAT (disambiguation)
- Eater (disambiguation)
- Feeding (disambiguation)
