= Adaptive machine =

An adaptive machine is a category of industrial machinery characterized by the ability to adapt itself to the product to be produced, e.g. to move individual products through the manufacturing, assembly, inspection, packaging and other process stations required to produce them.

== Examples of intelligent adaptive capabilities ==
- Detecting the size and shape of products in a current production batch and automatically adapting the distance of the actuators used to clamp them and to transport them through the processing line
- Adapting the route a product takes through a processing line based on the specifications of the product; each product can take its own individual route through a production line and only stop at processing stations where it actually needs processing. Unnecessary stations are by-passed, via an alternate route or just passed through. This is in stark contrast to fixed-indexing systems such as belt and chain conveyors or round dials that still represent the majority of installed manufacturing equipment.

== Exemplary non-characteristics ==
- Using a multitude of work-piece holders specific to each single product variant
- Operator intervention for mechanical change-over (e.g. exchanging mechanical cams)

== Design approach ==
At first glance, the adaptive capabilities are rooted in software. But a second look reveals that machines handle physical products. For doing so machines need a proper mechanical design as well as a proper electrical design to power the mechanical movements. An adaptive machine is best designed by applying an interdisciplinary mechatronic design approach where mechanics, electrics and software as well as their interfaces and interactions are considered holistically.

== Purpose ==
The primary function of an adaptive machine is to make production more flexible by enable greater product variety (e.g. with respect to product size and shape) and smaller batches. The ultimate goal of an adaptive machine is mass customization, and the holy grail of economical batch size, one product, made to customer order rather than for stock. As far back as 1997, the Harvard Business Review identified four approaches to mass customization, one being ‘adaptive customizers’ in which standard products are adapted by the customer. The adaptive machine is actually more representative of HBR’s collaborative and cosmetic approaches, in which products and/or packaging are customized during production.

This description was provided by the Frost & Sullivan research firm in October 2017.

== Core enabling technologies ==
The concept of the adaptive machine relies on the following core technologies to enable adaptability and to achieve high levels of flexibility.

- Track technology
- Robots: One complementary technology is the industrial robot, which by definition possesses the same programmable flexibility. Of particular interest is the ability of both robots and track systems to operate safely along with humans in a collaborative environment. This recent development allows for a combination of manual and automated assembly tasks, maintenance and materials replenishment without stopping production.
- Machine vision: Machine vision can play a pivotal role when integrated into an adaptive machine. Vision can identify individual shuttles and their contents in order to guide them to the appropriate workstations. Vision has long been used to automate robot guidance, inspection, orientation and related tasks.
- Internet of Things and e-commerce technologies: given the adaptive machine's flexibility to respond to consumer demand generation these technologies are complementary, providing the connection between internal production resources and commercial systems in a manufacturer's digital business model

== Terminology and history ==
The term has been attributed to B&R Industrial Automation, where it is used in their product descriptions, white papers and use cases. In the packaging sector the evolution of machine technology has been roughly categorized by OMAC as follows:

1. Gen 1 – mechanically driven machines
2. Gen 2 – servo motors added to mechanical Gen 1 designs
3. Gen 3 – full servo driven electronic line shaft machine

Gen 4 will be the generation of the adaptive machine.

The adaptive machine terminology was developed to define a category, as well as to define the purpose, functionality and especially the application benefits of such technologies to make production processes more flexible and productive in terms of commercial objectives.

=== The adaptive machine and machine learning ===
The adaptive machine category should not be confused with adaptive manufacturing or adaptive machine learning. Adaptive machines can be quite effective in an adaptive manufacturing environment and can benefit from adaptive machine learning applications. But they are neither interchangeable terms nor require one another to fulfill their basic definitions.

== Adaptive machines in the commercial marketplace ==
Adaptive machines are increasingly entering the industrial workplace. Applications include ‘bottling on demand,’ in which soft drinks are individually blended at the filling valve and fitted with customized closures and labels and product codes.

Another is a labeling machine that can handle different size and shape bottles and labels without stopping and performing a changeover.

Another example is a bottle unscrambler that uses a combination of delta robots and the synchronized motion of two shuttles to act as infinitely adjustable pucks, to handle different container shapes and sizes, also without changeover.

A cartoning machine uses a track system in place of a variable pitch bucket conveyor for collating and loading different primary packs into cartons.
