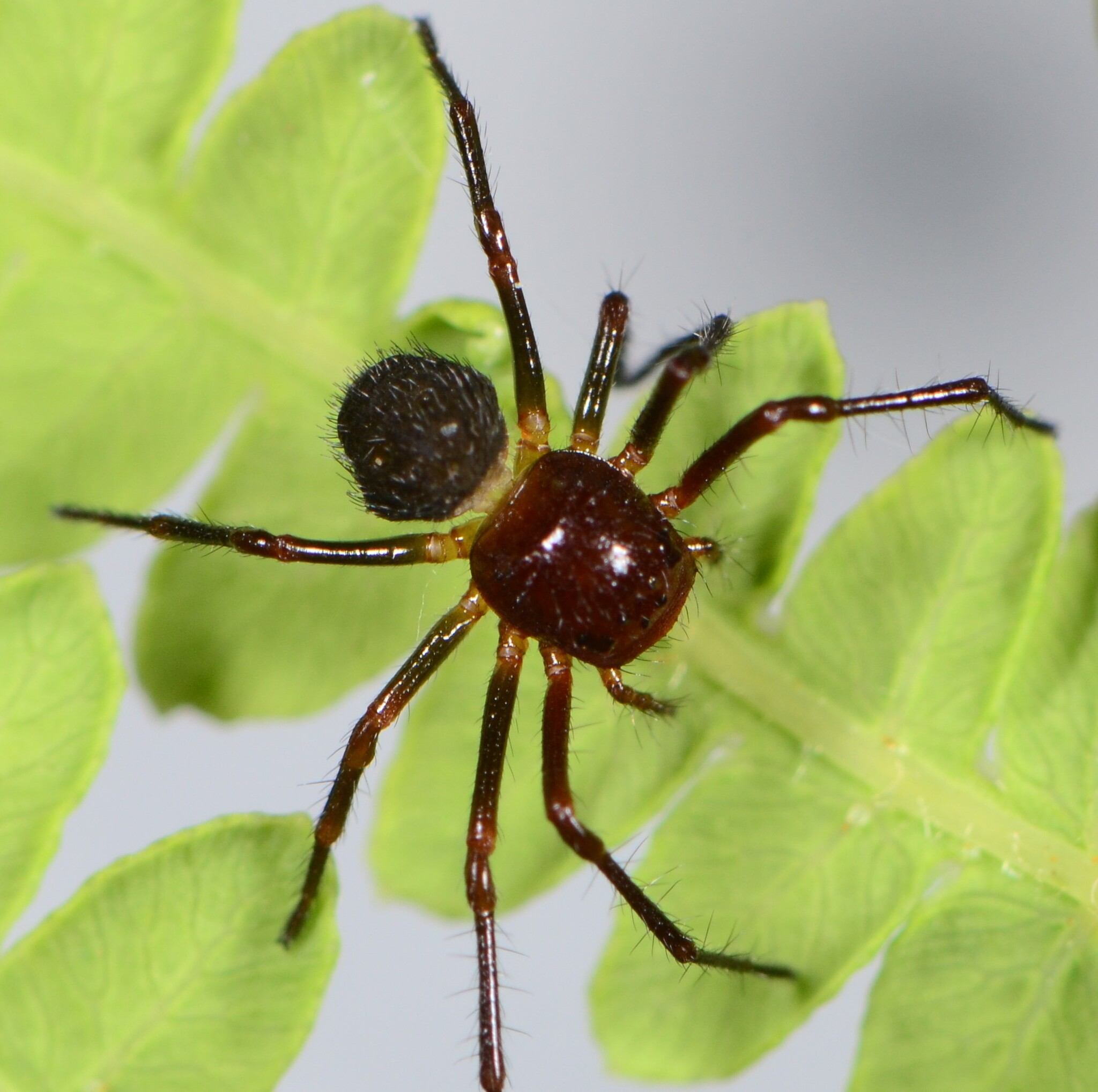
- female S. ndumi
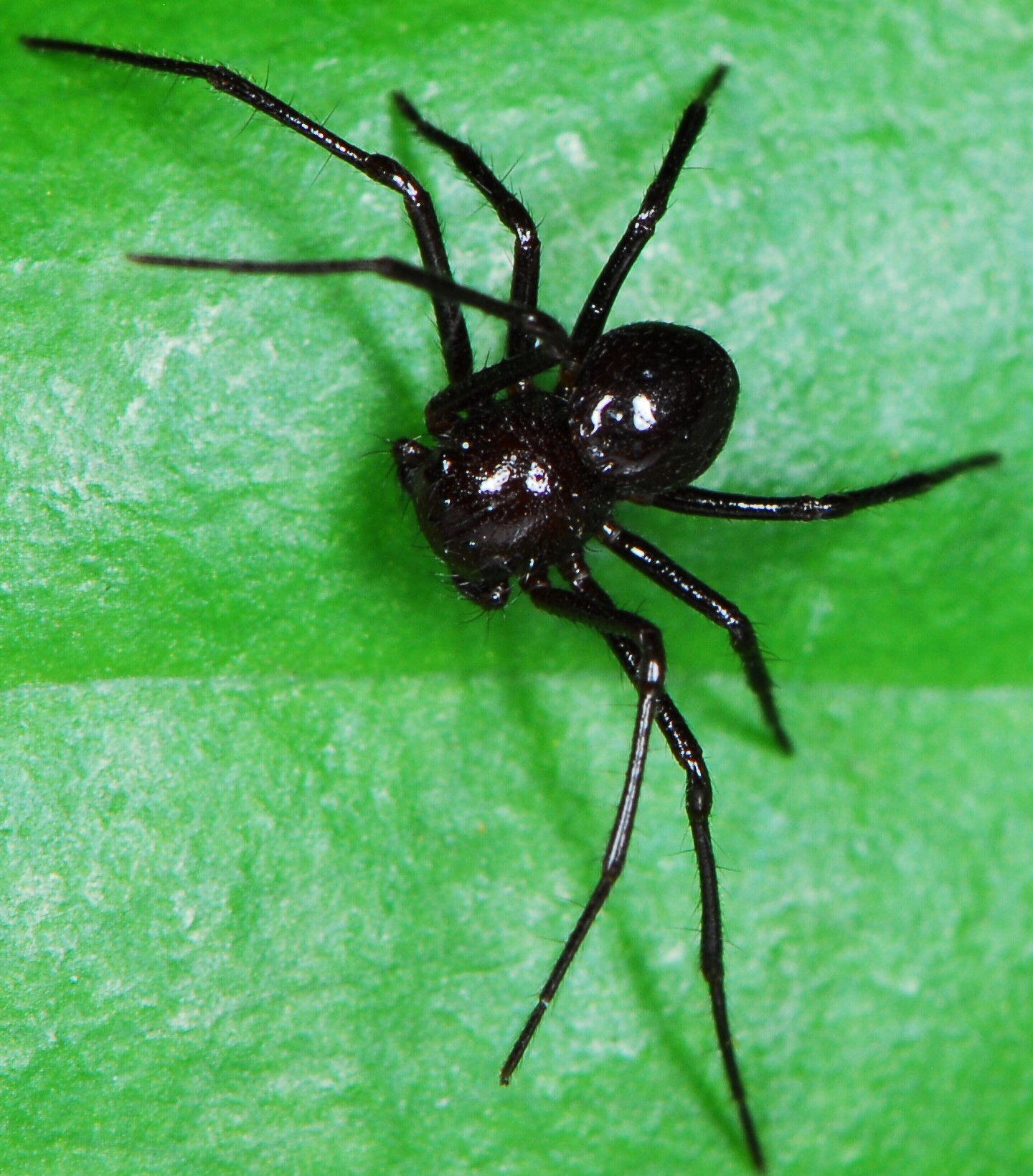
- female S. ndumi

Scientific classification
- Kingdom: Animalia
- Phylum: Arthropoda
- Subphylum: Chelicerata
- Class: Arachnida
- Order: Araneae
- Infraorder: Araneomorphae
- Family: Thomisidae
- Genus: Sylligma; Simon

Type species
- Sylligma hirsuta

Species
- 7, see text

= Sylligma =

Genus of spiders

Sylligma is a genus of spiders in the family Thomisidae with seven African species. It was first described in 1895 by Simon.

== Species ==
As of September 2025, this genus includes seven species:

- Sylligma cribrata (Simon, 1901) – Ethiopia
- Sylligma franki Lewis & Dippenaar-Schoeman, 2011 – DR Congo, Mozambique, Rwanda, Uganda
- Sylligma hirsuta Simon, 1895 – Gabon, Congo, Rwanda, Namibia (type species)
- Sylligma lawrencei Millot, 1942 – Gabon, Nigeria, Guinea, Congo
- Sylligma ndumi Lewis & Dippenaar-Schoeman, 2011 – Botswana, South Africa, Eswatini
- Sylligma spartica Lewis & Dippenaar-Schoeman, 2011 – Congo
- Sylligma theresa Lewis & Dippenaar-Schoeman, 2011 – Nigeria, Rwanda, Kenya
