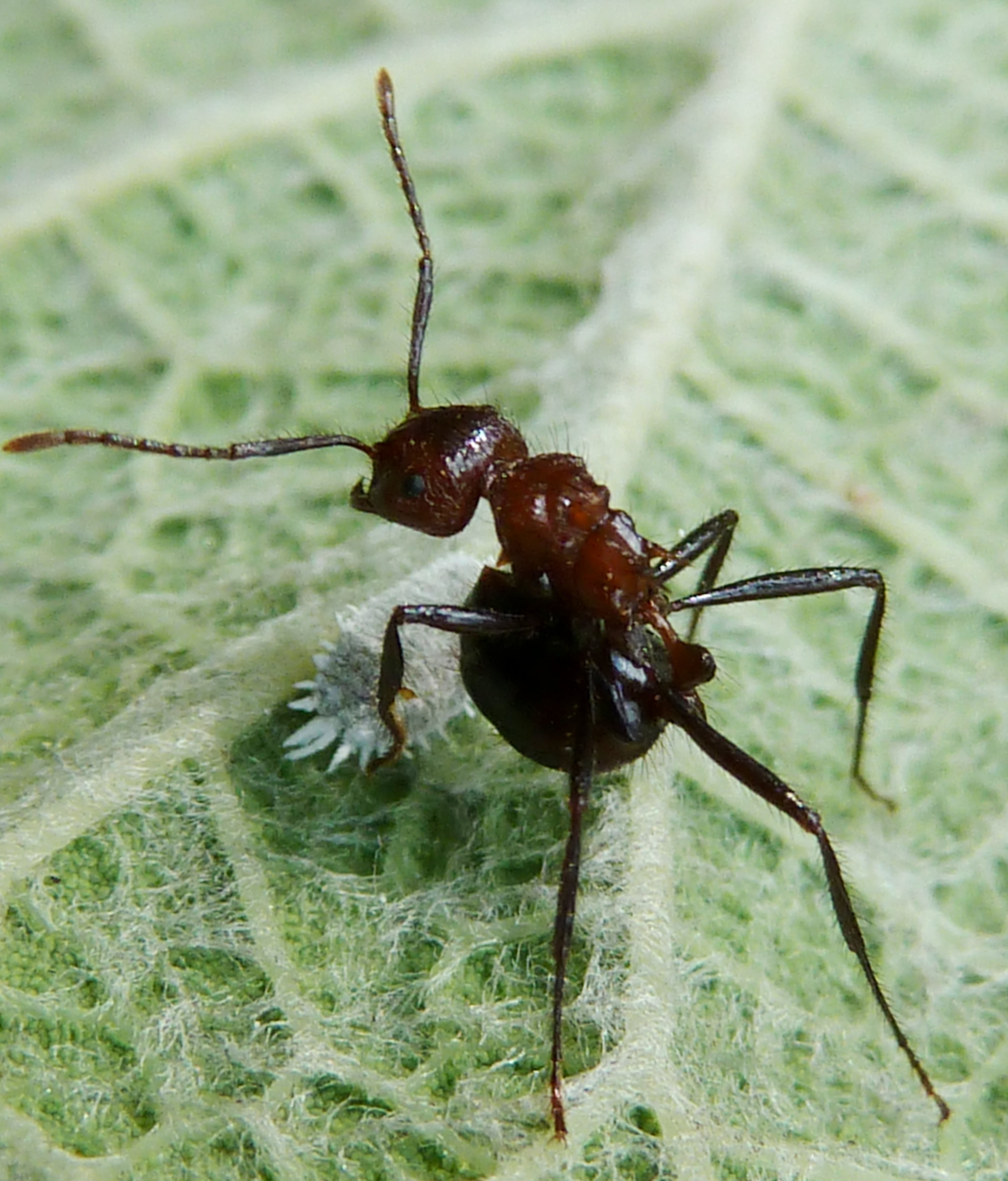
- M. natalensis tending a mealy bug

Scientific classification
- Domain: Eukaryota
- Kingdom: Animalia
- Phylum: Arthropoda
- Class: Insecta
- Order: Hymenoptera
- Family: Formicidae
- Subfamily: Myrmicinae
- Genus: Myrmicaria
- Species: M. natalensis

Binomial name
- Myrmicaria natalensis (F.Smith, 1858)

= Myrmicaria natalensis =

Natal droptail ant

Species of ant

Myrmicaria natalensis, commonly known as the Natal droptail ant, is a species of ant with an extensive range in the Afrotropics. It has been recorded from Guinea, Ivory Coast, Uganda, DRC, Tanzania, Mozambique, Angola, Namibia and South Africa, where the type was obtained. Like others in its genus, it has a distinctive down-curved gaster and spines on the mesosoma.

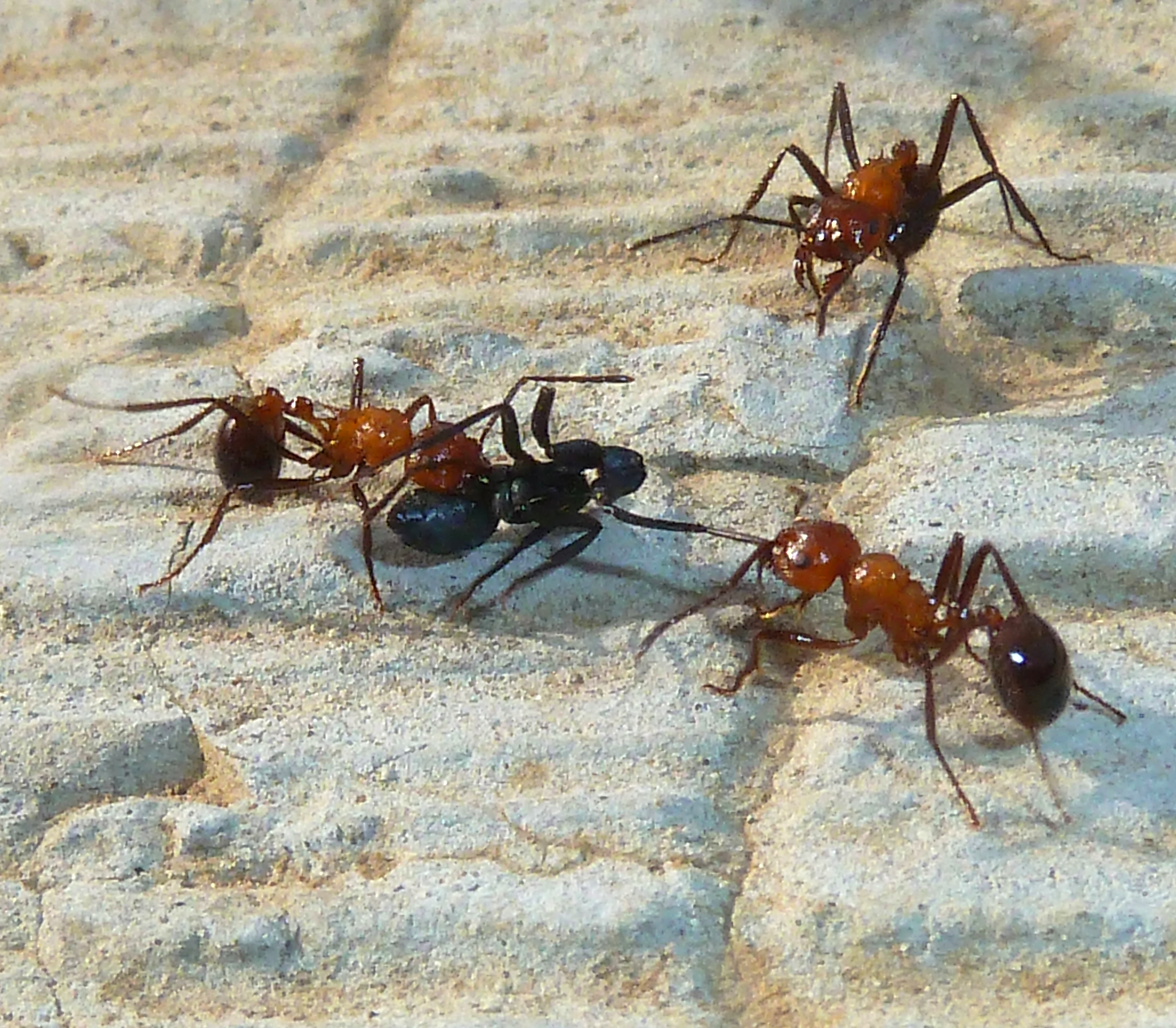
Workers with ant prey

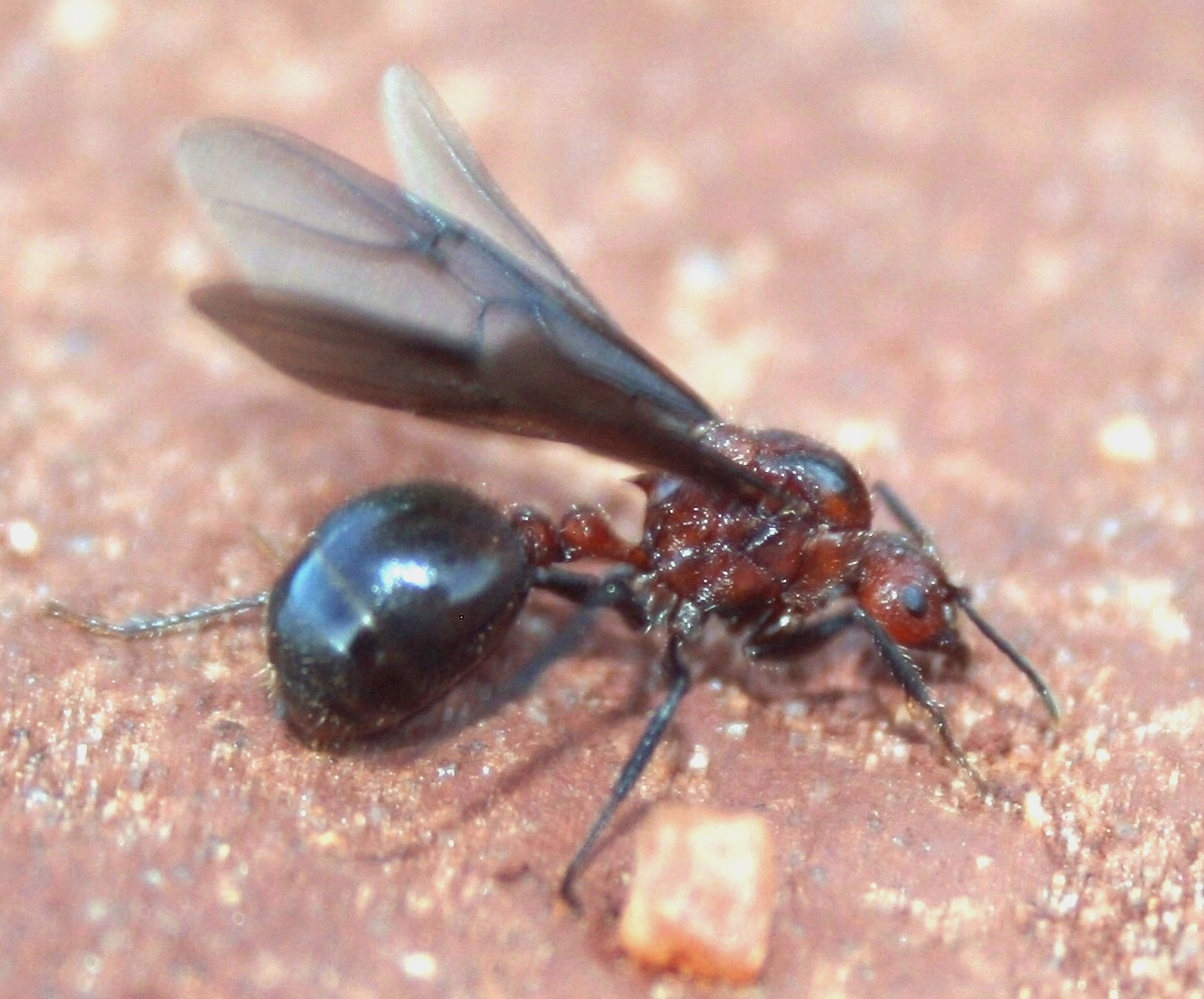
An unmated queen
