= Eggelsberg =

- Municipality
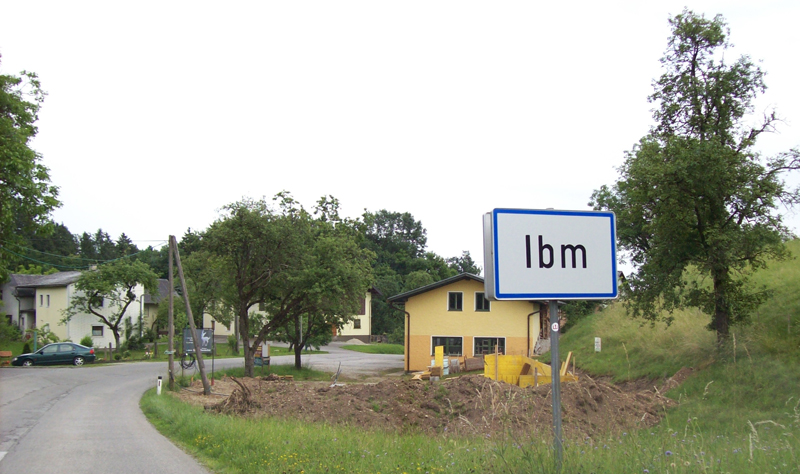

- Coat of arms

- Location within Austria
- Coordinates: 48°04′40″N 12°59′34″E
- Country: Austria
- State: Upper Austria
- District: Braunau am Inn

Government
  - Mayor: Christian Kager (ÖVP)

Area
  - Total: 24.15 km^{2} (9.32 sq mi)
- Elevation: 531 m (1,742 ft)

Population (2018-01-01)
  - Total: 2,365
  - Density: 97.93/km^{2} (253.6/sq mi)
- Time zone: UTC+1 (CET)
  - Summer (DST): UTC+2 (CEST)
- Postal code: 5142
- Area code: 07748
- Vehicle registration: BR
- Website: www.eggelsberg.at

Eggelsberg is a municipality in the district Braunau am Inn in Austrian state of Upper Austria.

== Geography ==
Eggelsberg lies in the Innviertel. About 20 percent of the municipality is forest and 69 percent farmland. The Ibmer Moor is the largest moor in Austria.

Eggelsberg includes the Katastralgemeinden (subdivisions) Gundertshausen, Heimhausen, Haselreith, and Ibm (pictured).

== Settlements ==
In brackets: Inhabitants as 1 January 2020

- Arnstetten (40)
- Autmannsdorf (62)
- Beckenberg (44)
- Bergstetten (78)
- Eggelsberg (876)
- Großschäding (31)
- Gundertshausen (218)
- Haselreith (39)
- Hehenberg (19)
- Heimhausen (93)
- Hitzging (14)
- Hötzenau (2)
- Ibm (331)
- Kleinschäding (48)
- Meindlsberg (5)
- Miesling (12)
- Oberhaslach (10)
- Oberhaunsberg (20)
- Pippmannsberg (53)
- Revier Eggelsberg (72)
- Revier Gundertshausen (114)
- Revier Heimhausen (57)
- Trametshausen (64)
- Untergrub (6)
- Unterhaunsberg (39)
- Wannersdorf (73)
- Weilbuch (13)
- Weinberg (16)
