= B&R =

Austrian automation and process control technology company

B&R Industrial Automation GmbH
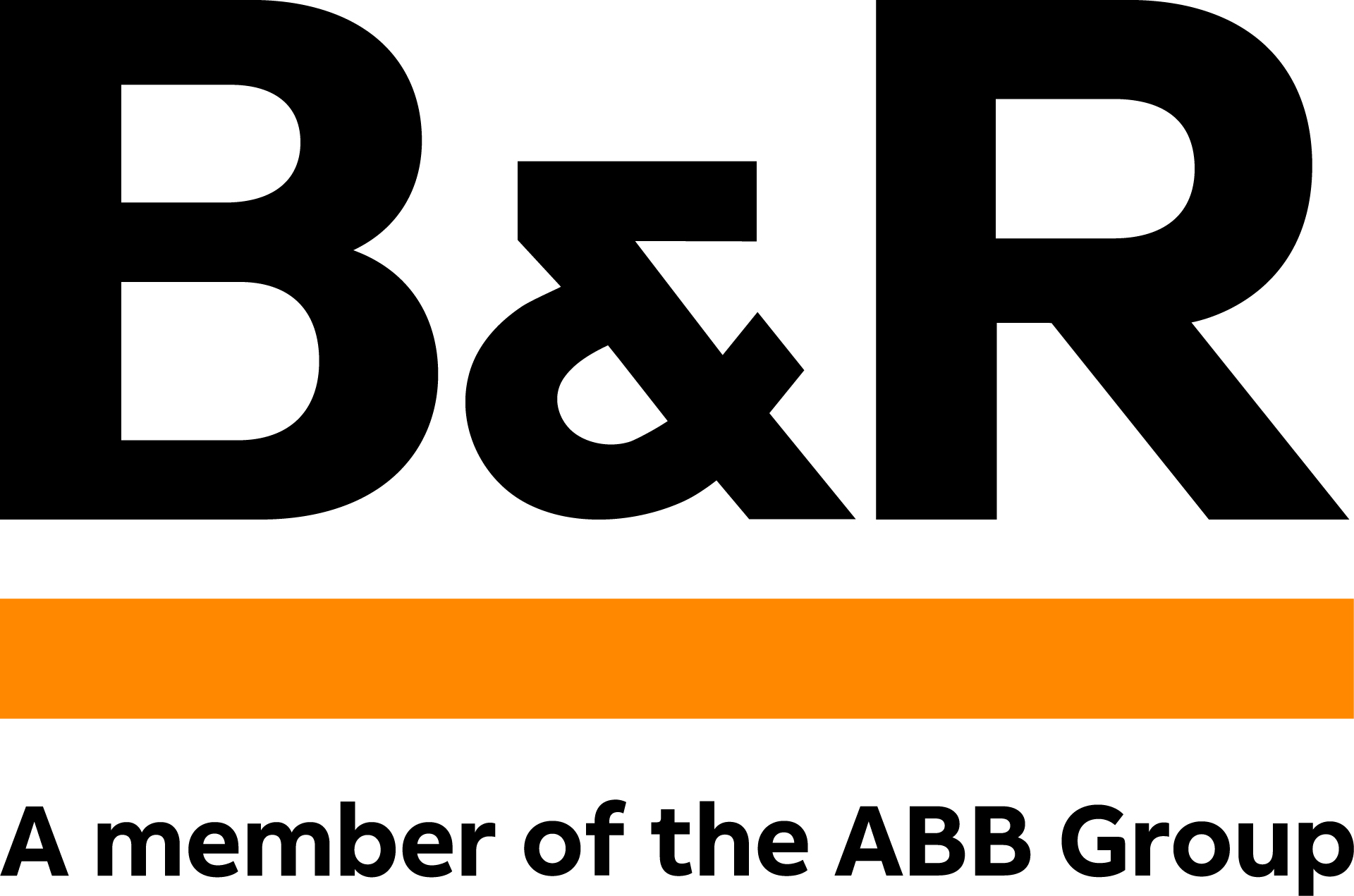
- Type: GmbH (Gesellschaft mit beschränkter Haftung)
- Industry: Industrial automation
- Founded: 1979; 47 years ago in Eggelsberg, Austria
- Founders: Erwin Bernecker; Josef Rainer
- Headquarters: Eggelsberg, Upper Austria, Austria
- Number of locations: 190 offices in 68 countries
- Key people: Joerg Theis (CEO), Clemens Sager (CFO)
- Revenue: approx. 620 Mio. €
- Number of employees: 3,000 (2016)
- Parent: ABB Group
- Website: B&R Homepage

B&R Industrial Automation GmbH is an Austrian automation and process control technology company. It was founded in 1979 by Erwin Bernecker and Josef Rainer, and is headquartered in Eggelsberg, near Braunau in the state of Upper Austria.

The company specializes in machine and factory control systems, HMI and motion control. In addition to scalable complete solutions, B&R also offers individual components. The product range is oriented toward machinery and equipment manufacturing, and the company is also active in the field of factory and process automation.

In July 2017, the company was acquired by the Swiss ABB Group.

== Performance ==
B&R concluded 2015 with a revenue of €585 million, a 10% increase over the previous year. In 2014, the company posted growth of 13% to 535 million euros. In the same year, B&R opened two new subsidiaries in Japan. and Singapore.

The company's 2013 revenue of 475 million euros represented a growth of 11% over the previous year. 2013 also saw the founding of B&R subsidiaries in Turkey and Taiwan.
