= Kleptopharmacophagy =

Act of stealing chemical compounds for consumption

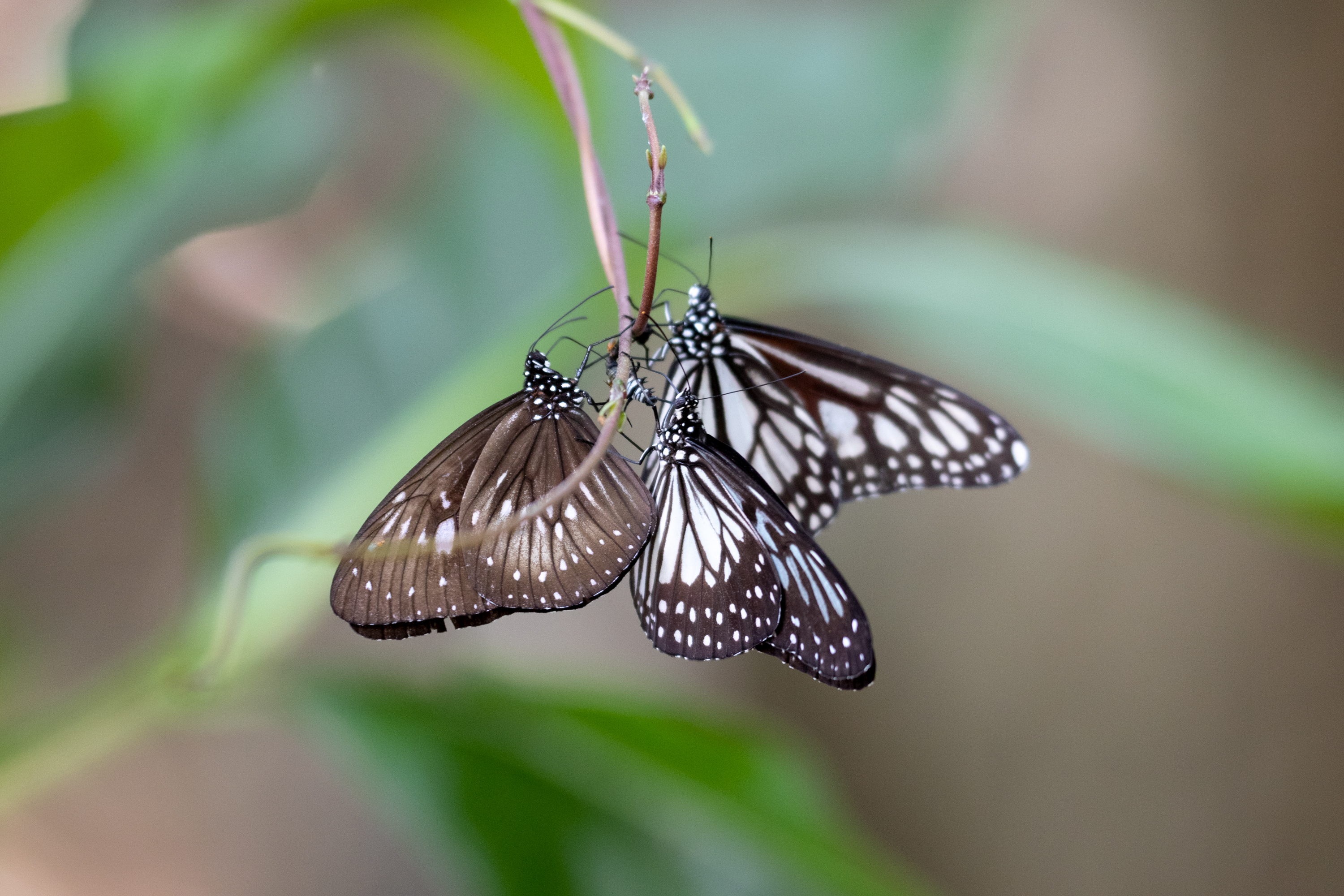
A group of danaine butterflies feeding on the caterpillar of Idea blanchardii blanchardii. From left to right: Euploea algea kirbyi, Ideopsis juventa tontoliensis, Danaus ismare ismare.

Kleptopharmacophagy is a term used for describing the ecological relationship between two different organisms, where the first is stealing the second's chemical compounds and consuming them. This scientific term was proposed by Australian, Singaporean, and American biologists in September 2021 in an article that was published in the journal Ecology by the Ecological Society of America. The phenomenon was first noticed in milkweed butterflies that were attacking caterpillars and drinking their internal liquid, proposedly to obtain toxic alkaloids used for defense, as well as for mating purposes.

== Characteristics ==
Kleptopharmacophagy is a generic term and a scientific neologism describing the phenomenon of chemical theft between living organisms. This behavior is new to researchers, as it does not match traditional descriptions of biological interaction such as predation, parasitism and mutualism. Besides being an interspecific interaction, kleptopharmacophagy can also be cannibalistic (hence an intraspecific act), with adults attacking larvae of their own species.

== In butterflies ==
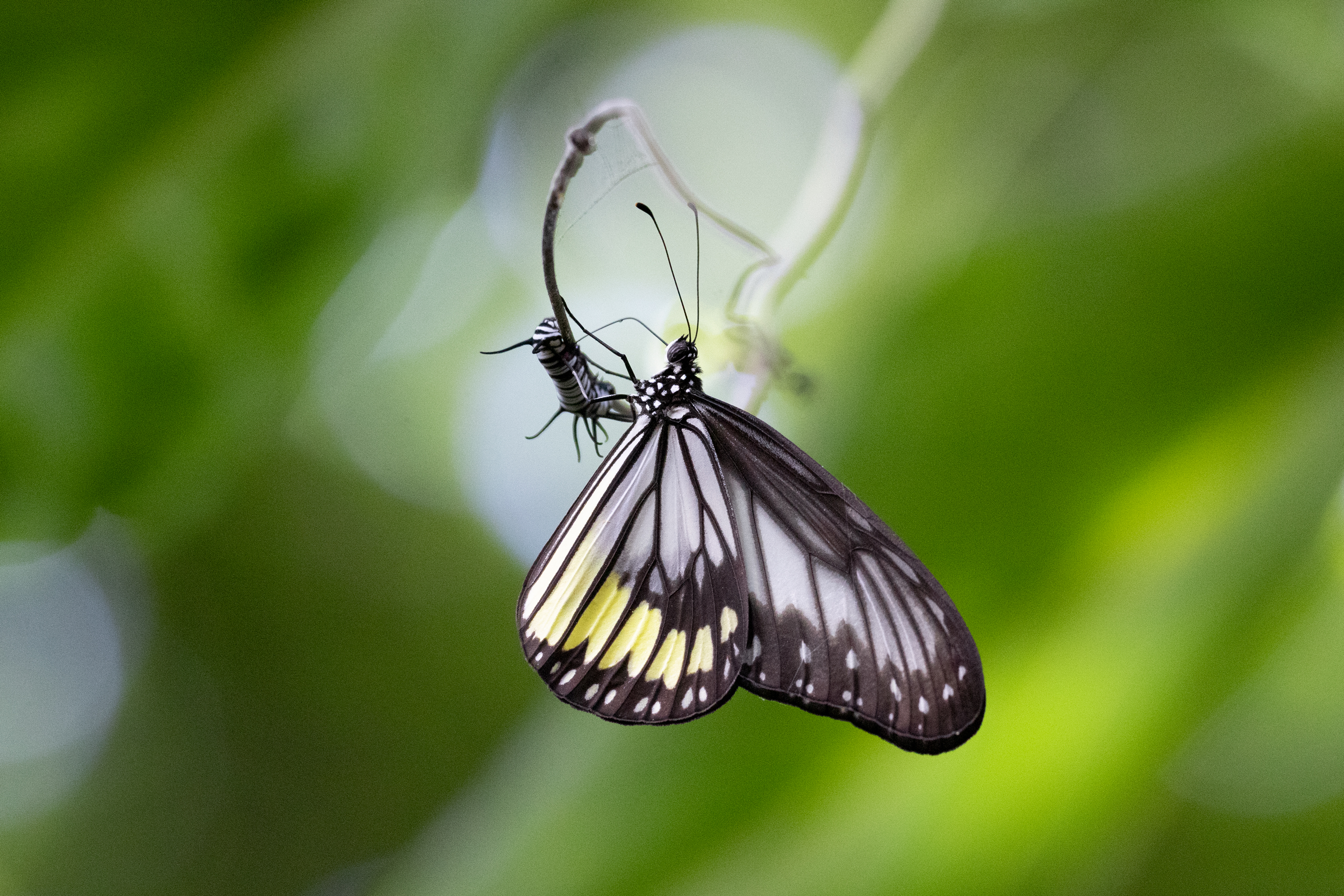
Kleptopharmacophagy was first observed in milkweed butterflies. Here a male Ideopsis vitrea vitrea is seen scratching and feeding on the caterpillar of Idea blanchardii blanchardii.

Kleptopharmacophagy has only been reported for butterflies in the subfamily Danainae, more commonly known as the milkweed butterflies. The phenomenon was first described in butterflies that were observed scratching and feeding on live larvae of other milkweed butterflies. The initial discovery was made in year 2019 in forests of North Sulawesi, in Indonesia, when two researchers noticed that milkweed butterflies of different species, well-known for their toxicity and bright warning colours (aposematism), were interacting with the larval stages of other butterflies. The adult insects were attacking and harassing the caterpillars by scratching at them with tarsal claws on their legs. The butterflies then imbibed the juices from the wounded caterpillars with their long and curved proboscis. Caterpillars that were targeted appeared to range from living to dead and dying individuals. Live caterpillars were observed to contort their bodies in an attempt to deter scratching, but usually succumbed to the repeat harassment.

There is also one recorded example of kleptopharmacophagy occurring between two adult butterflies; A male Ideopsis vitrea vitrea was feeding on a liquid, oozing from the wings of the male I. blanchardii blanchardii.

=== Role ===
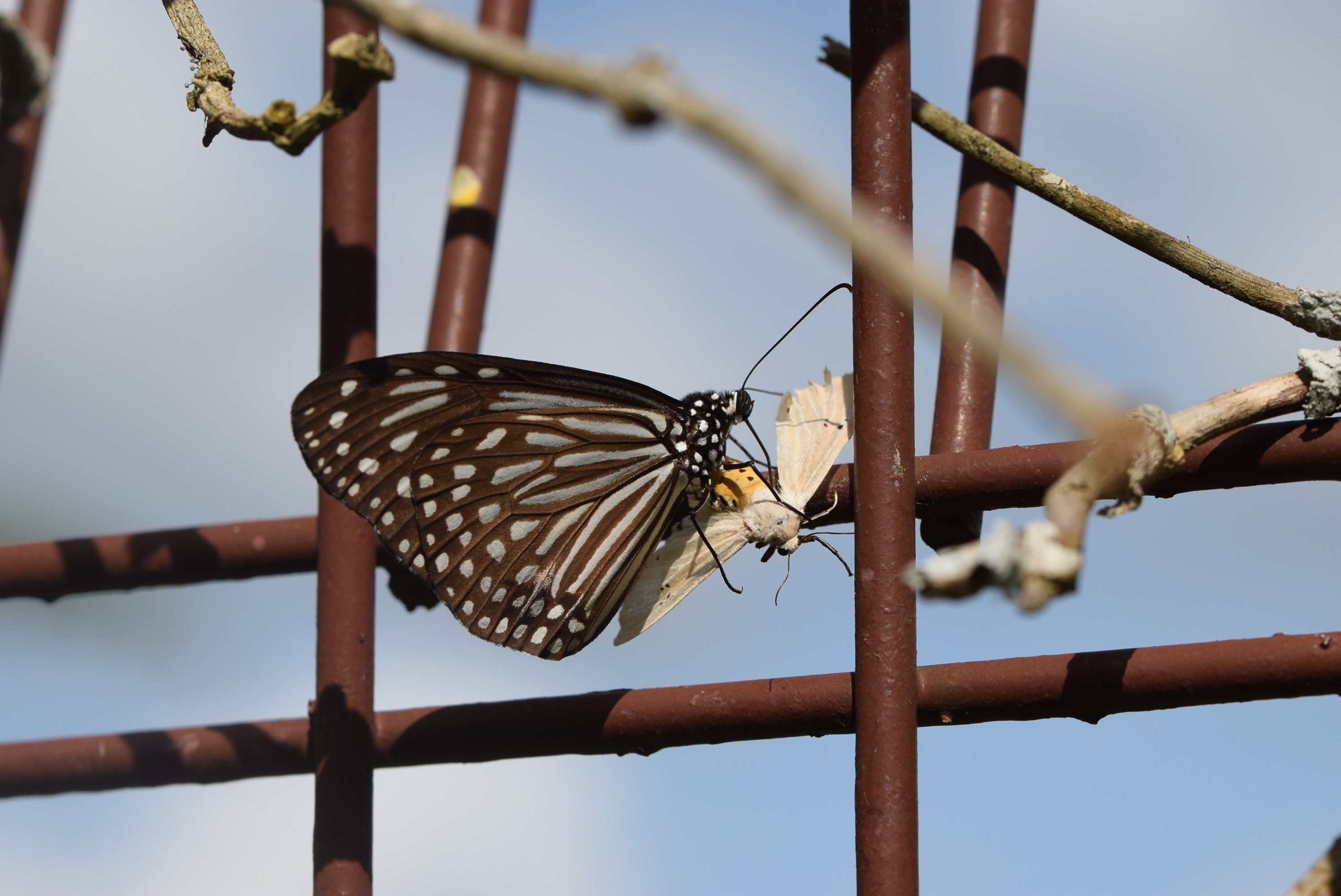
Parantica algeoides algeoides feeding on a dead arctiine moth. Arctiine moths are known to be chemically defended by pyrrolizidine alkaloids. In cases where the carcasses of alkaloid containing insects are preferred, the term necropharmacophagy may be more applicable.

It is thought that such chemical theft serves at least two roles. By feeding on toxic caterpillars, the adult butterflies acquire additional toxins, which serve as a protection against predation. The stolen toxins, mostly pyrrolizidine alkaloids (PAs), are also of great importance for male butterflies, which use those compounds for producing mating pheromones. Additionally such chemicals are components of so-called nuptial gifts, consisting of male sperm and some nutrients, that are given from males to females during mating. Significance of the alkaloid use for male butterflies can be demonstrated through observation of male danaine butterflies congregating in large numbers at alkaloid producing plants, where they spend hours fervently scratching and liberating plant juices.

=== Similar behaviour ===
Milkweed butterflies have also been previously seen feasting on some moribund pyrgomorphid grasshoppers, that are known to contain toxic alkaloids, as well as obtaining desired chemicals from carcasses of dead insects of different taxa. Note that in this case, the term necropharmacophagy may be more appropriate, since butterflies feed on dead animals.

Similar behavior was observed with adult butterflies scratching leaves of different plants that possess various toxins in their vegetative organs (so-called leaf-scratching). Adult male danaine butterflies use their sharp tarsal claws to scratch and damage leaves of plants that contain high levels of pyrrolizidine alkaloids, thereby liberating the juices for consumption. Since kleptopharmacophagy was recorded and described only a few times, it is thought that obtaining such chemicals by feeding on plants with alkaloids is a common and more frequent way of stocking toxins. Kleptopharmacophagy is proposed to be an alternative way of acquiring these chemicals.

== Bibliography ==
- Tea, Yi-Kai; Wei, Jonathan Soong; Beaver, Ethan P.; Lohman, David J. (2021-09-08). "Kleptopharmacophagy? Milkweed butterflies scratch and imbibe from Apocynaceae-feeding caterpillars". Ecology. 102 (12): e03532. Bibcode:2021Ecol..102E3532T. doi:10.1002/ecy.3532. ISSN 1939-9170. PMID 34496059.
