= FEED =

FEED may refer to:

- FEED Projects, an international hunger-fighting charity
- Foundation for European Economic Development, a charity formed in November 1990 under the auspices of European Association for Evolutionary and Political Economy
- Front-End Engineering Design, a process for conceptual development of processing industry projects
