= Eat Me =

Eat Me may refer to:

== Films ==
- Eat Me! (2000 film), a comedy film
- Eat Me! (2009 film), a horror comedy film
- Eat Me (2018 film), a film featuring Brad Carter

== Literature ==
- "Eat Me", a story by Robert R. McCammon that received the Bram Stoker Award for Best Short Story
- "Eat Me", a poem by Patience Agbabi
- "EAT ME", a phrase written on a cake in Alice in Wonderland

== Music ==
- "Eat Me" (song), by Demi Lovato featuring Royal & the Serpent, 2022
- "Eat Me", a song by Arkarna from Fresh Meat
- "Eat Me", a song by Ozzy Osbourne from Ordinary Man

== Television ==
- "Eat Me" (Farscape episode)

== See also ==
- Drink Me (disambiguation)
- Eat Me, Drink Me, an album by Marilyn Manson
