= Feeder line (manufacturing) =

A feeder line is a secondary assembly line which provides parts for use in a primary assembly line. Researchers assert that the traditional level scheduling methodology of assembly line planning is not effective unless feeder lines provide parts to the primary assembly line.

== Bibliography ==
- Boysen, Nils; Fliedner, Malte; Scholl, Armin (2009), "Level Scheduling for batched JIT supply" (PDF), Flexible Services and Manufacturing Journal, 21 (1–2), Berlin, DE: Springer Science+Business Media, LLC: 31–50, doi:10.1007/s10696-009-9058-z
