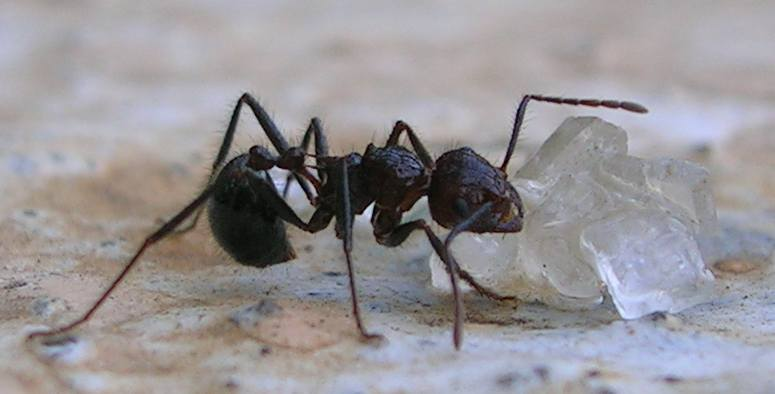
- M. brunnea feeding on a sugar crystal

Scientific classification
- Domain: Eukaryota
- Kingdom: Animalia
- Phylum: Arthropoda
- Class: Insecta
- Order: Hymenoptera
- Family: Formicidae
- Subfamily: Myrmicinae
- Genus: Myrmicaria
- Species: M. brunnea

Binomial name
- Myrmicaria brunnea Saunders, 1842

= Myrmicaria brunnea =

Species of ant

Myrmicaria brunnea is a species of ant that is native to southern Asia. They have a distinctive down-curved abdomen and spines on the thorax.

== Description ==
The following taxonomic description is based on C. T. Bingham.

=== Worker ===
Chestnut-brown, shining; mandibles finely and closely, head and thorax more or less widely, longitudinally striate; the nodes of the pedicel smooth or only slightly rugulose; abdomen polished and smooth; pilosity long, abundant, reddish yellow, slightly oblique on the antennae and legs. For the rest the characters of the genus.

=== Queen ===
Resembles the worker in colour; the mandibles are more coarsely striate, the clypeus is smooth, the front between the antennae and the cheeks longitudinally striate, the head posteriorly on the vertex and lateral angles coarsely reticulate. Thorax: the pronotum somewhat vaguely and transversely and the mesonotum posteriorly longitudinally striate; anteriorly the latter is smooth and polished, the scutellum rugose, the metanotum irregularly striate rugose, including the basal portion of the metanotal spines. Pedicel :the nodes rugulose, opaque; abdomen smooth, polished and shining. Wings hyaline; nervures brownish.

=== Male ===
Light chestnut-yellow, the apical margins of the abdominal segments more or less broadly brownish black; head and thorax somewhat densely pubescent, in places rugulose, giving them a dull subopaque look; head on each side of the ocelli longitudinally striate. Some few striae on the mesonotum posteriorly and on the basal portion of the metanotum, traces of the same on the apical face of the latter. Pedicel obscurely rugulose, subopaque; abdomen smooth, shining, but not highly polished. Wings flavo-hyaline; nervures yellowish.

=== Variation ===
Var. subcarinata, Smith, is slighter, more slender and lighter in colour, often nearly smooth; it occurs in Bengal, Burma, and Tenasserim, and extends down to Borneo. The colour and the rugosity, as well as the pilosity, vary very much; but, so far as a very long series has enabled me to judge, the one species with many slightly differing local races extends through India, Ceylon, and Burma.
