= Fluid feeder =

Fluid feeders (aka liquichapses) are organisms that feed on the fluid of other organisms. It can refer to:

== Carnivore ==
- Hematophagy, feeding on blood

== Herbivore ==
- Nectarivore, feeding on nectar
- Plant sap feeders

== Pica ==
- Renfield's syndrome, feeding on blood as pica
- Urophagia, feeding on urine as pica
