= Bin picking =

Problem in computer vision and robotics

Bin picking (also referred to as random bin picking) is a core problem in computer vision and robotics. The goal is to have a robot with sensors and cameras attached to it pick-up known objects with random poses out of a bin using a suction gripper, parallel gripper, or other kind of robot end effector. Early work on bin picking made use of Photometric Stereo in recovering the shapes of objects and to determine their orientation in space.

Amazon previously held a competition focused on bin picking referred to as the "Amazon Picking Challenge", which was held from 2015 to 2017. The challenge tasked entrants with building their own robot hardware and software that could attempt simplified versions of the general task of picking and stowing items on shelves. The robots were scored by how many items were picked and stowed in a fixed amount of time. The first Amazon Robotics challenge was won by a team from TU Berlin in 2015, followed by a team from TU Delft and the Dutch company "Fizyr" in 2016. The last Amazon Robotics Challenge was won by the Australian Centre for Robotic Vision at Queensland University of Technology with their robot named Cartman. The Amazon Robotics/Picking Challenge was discontinued following the 2017 competition.

Although there can be some overlap, bin picking is distinct from "each picking" and the bin packing problem.

== See also ==
- 3D pose estimation
- Bowl feeder
