= Bowl feeder =

Vibrating device for orienting small parts

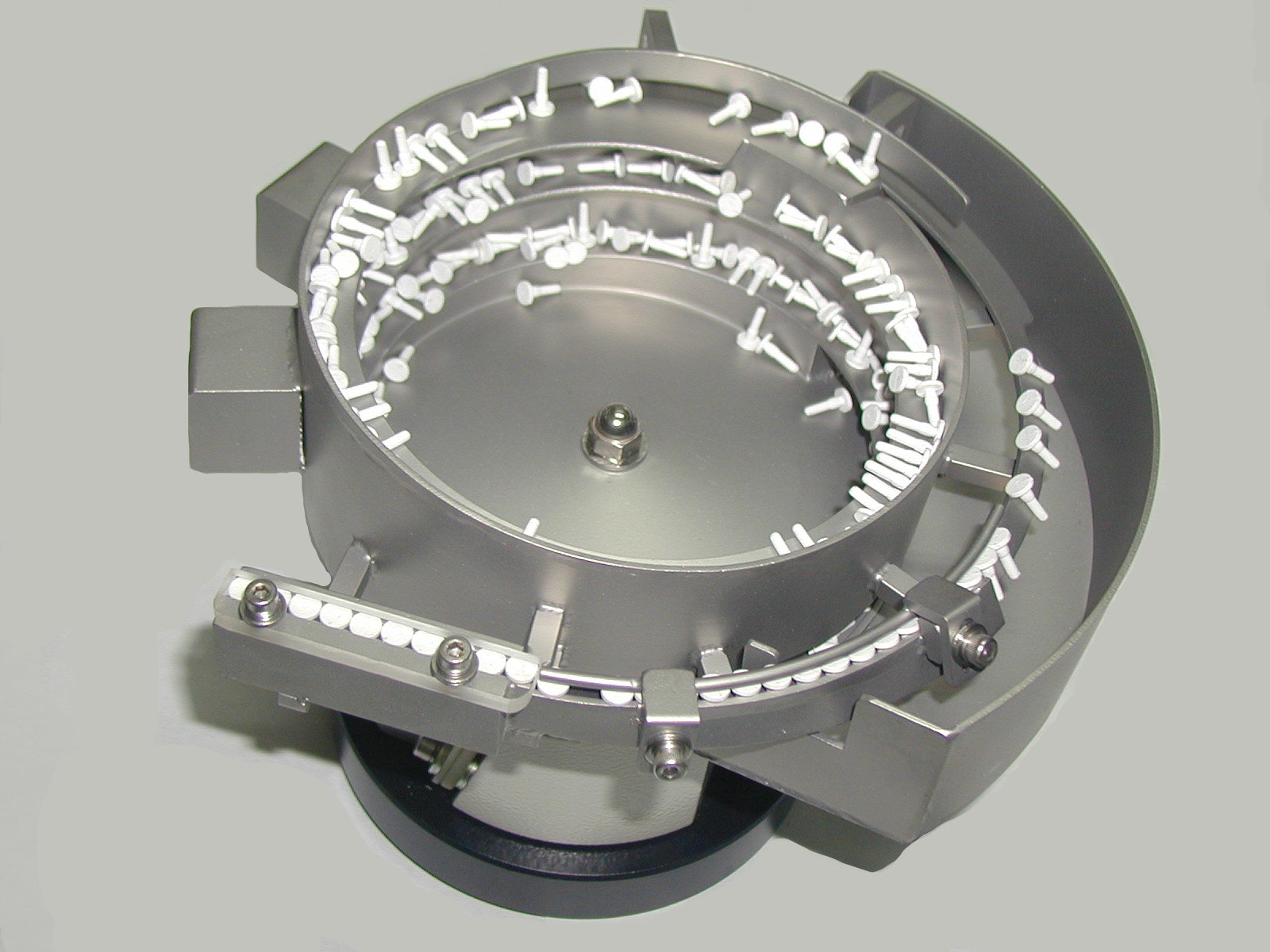
Vibratory bowl feeder feeding plastic pins. Vibrations move the pins up the ramp. A slot in the wall at the top lets the narrow end of pins slide through, with the head facing inward. Pins that don't align this way fall back into the bowl as the ramp narrows. Aligned pins slide down the narrow ramp and slip under a curved rod which holds them in place until they end up at the output station.

Vibratory bowl feeders, also known as a bowl feeders, are common devices used to orient and feed individual component parts for assembly on industrial production lines. They are used when a randomly sorted bulk package of small components must be fed into another machine one-by-one, oriented in a particular direction.

== Design ==
A vibratory feeder is a self-contained device designed to manipulate parts of the same type into a specific orientation. It consists of a specially shaped bowl with ramps and other features designed for the parts being fed. Usually included is an out feed accumulation track (linear or gravity) to convey parts along and discharge into the assembly machine comes in many shapes and sizes. The drive unit, available in piezoelectric, electromagnetic and pneumatic drives, vibrates the bowl, forcing the parts to move up a circular, inclined track. A vibrating drive unit, upon which the bowl is mounted and a variable-amplitude control box controls the bowl feeder and can adjust the flow of parts to the out feed track via sensors. The tooling (hand made) is designed to sort and orient the parts in to a consistent, repeatable position. The track length, width, and depth are carefully chosen to suit each application, component shape and size. Special bowl and track coatings are applied according to shape, size and material of the component. These aid traction, reduce damage to the parts and lower acoustic levels.

Vibratory feeders rely on the mechanical behaviour of a part, such that when gently shaken along a conveyor chute that is specially designed for the part, many will be gradually become aligned properly, and the rest will fall back into the bowl. Thus a stream of parts leave the feeder's conveyor one-by-one, all in the same orientation. This conveyor then leads directly to the following assembly or packing machine.

Orientation relies on the shape and mechanical behaviour of an object, particular the position of its centre of mass in relation to its centre of volume. It thus works well for parts such as machine screws, with rotational symmetry and a clear asymmetry to one heavy end. It does not work for entirely symmetrical shapes, or where desired orientation depends on a feature such as colour. The ramps within a bowl feeder are specifically designed for each part, although the core mechanism is re-used across different parts. The exit orientation of a bowl feeder depends on the part's shape and mass distribution. Where this is not the orientation needed for the following assembly step, a feeder is often followed by a twisted conveyor that turns the part over, as needed.

== Use ==
Vibratory feeders are utilized by all industries, including the pharmaceutical, automotive, electronic, cosmetic, food, fast moving consumable goods (FMCG), packaging and metalworking industries. It also serves other industries such as glass, foundry, steel, construction, recycling, pulp and paper, and plastics. Vibratory feeders offer a cost-effective alternative to manual labour, saving manufacturer's time and labour costs. Several factors must be considered when selecting a parts feeder, including the industry, application, material properties and product volume.

With increasing integration across an entire production process, the need for feeders is sometimes reduced by supplying the components on tape packages or similar, that keep them oriented the same way during shipping and storage. These are most common in fields such as electronics, where components must be used in a particular orientation, but this cannot be detected mechanically.

== History/inventor ==
- Feeder Bowl: 12/09/1950, US patent 2,654,465, Mario Thomas Sgriccia
- US Patent: US Patent 2,654,465
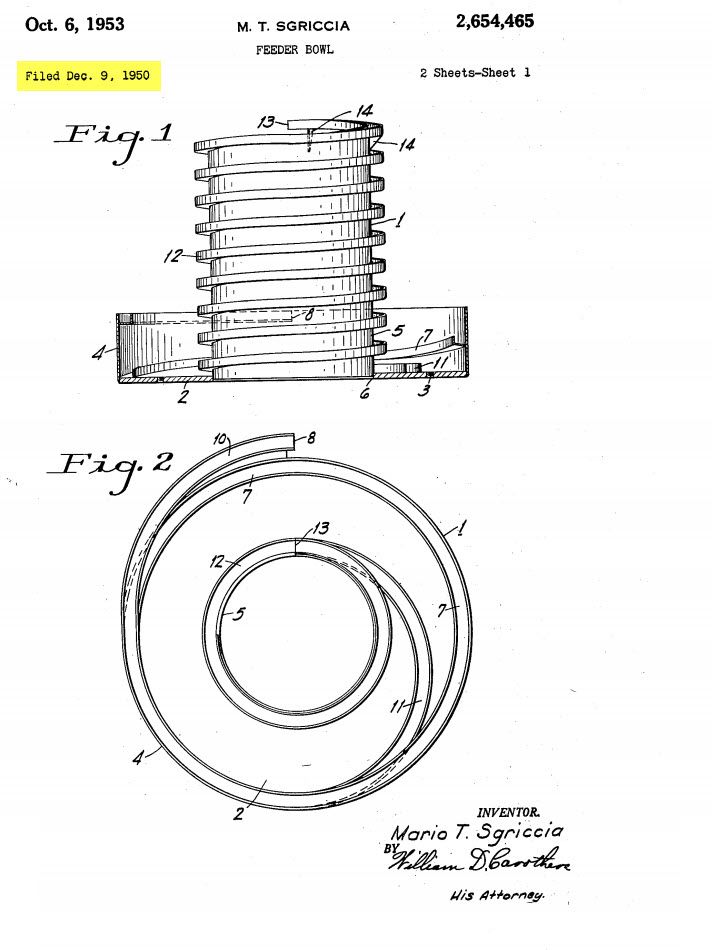
  Feeder bowl image from 1950 US patent 2,654,465
  See image.

== Type of bowls ==
Bowl	Material	Suitable for
Cylindrical bowl	Aluminium/stainless steel	Continuous transport of components and for handling small parts
Conical bowl	Aluminium/stainless steel	Heavy sharp-edged components Larger loads Automatic pre-separating
Stepped bowl	Aluminium/stainless steel	Larger loads and larger components See also conical bowls
Polyamide bowl (conical or stepped)		Small components with simple geometry and where mass production of feeders is required

== Types of feeding systems ==
- Bowl feeders: consist of a bowl top with a spiral track inside the bowl. The component parts are delivered from the bottom of the bowl feeder up the track into the top of the feeder as the bowl vibrates. The parts are then positioned in the proper position. These parts are usually then fed on to a vibratory or air track
- Centrifugal feeders: also referred to as "rotary feeders", have a conical central driven rotor surrounded by a circular bowl wall. The feeder separate component parts utilizing rotary force and the parts revolve with high speed and are pulled to the outside of the bowl.
- Step feeders: The component parts are collected from the hopper by elevating plates, pre-sorted and fed until they reach the desired transfer height. Key features of step feeder are that it operates quietly and without vibration.
- Linear feeders: Horizontal conveying of components. Used to handle irregular supplies of parts from upstream equipment, creating a buffer store and smooth flow for further processes. Special application: multi-track design.
- Carpet feeders: Enable gentle handling of orientated components from bulk to escapement devices creating product accumulation prior to a machine or handling unit.
- 3-Axis Vibration feeders: Robotic parts feeders using a vibratory plate to distribute parts evenly on a level surface for pickup by an industrial robot. This type of feeder allows very high performance flexible part feeding, part pre-orientation and optimal surface distribution of bulk parts and components.
- Space feeders: Space feeder is used for separating and feeding loose film bags, four-sided sealing bags, flow packs, 3D bags and so on. This type of feeder is versatile high speed units with the ability to isolate and equally pitch non-uniform and flexible components.
- Flexible feeders: A flexfeeder is a vision-based system that is paired with either a collaborative or an industrial robot to accomplish parts feeding tasks automatically. The vision system detects the parts and sends their coordinates to the robot for the picking. These systems can easily perform a product changeover: sometimes even automatically, if a quick emptying function is equipped. Robotic part feeders are able to handle a very wide variety of shapes, sizes, and materials of components on surfaces with different colors, textures, and degrees of adhesion. This type of feeder maximizes its efficiency by making the dropping, separating, and picking processes completely independent and simultaneous. Some kinds of flexible feeders can handle different types of components at the same time (with surfaces separated in multiple sectors) and work in continuous tracking mode for even better performances.

== Feeder system companies ==
- Wibramet Piotr Sokołowski: Polish manufacturer
- TAD Bowl Feeders
- Bellco Feeders
- Colletti Equipamentos: The most important Brazilian manufacturer.
- Ars s.r.l.: Italian manufacturer, produces the FlexiBowl® feeding system
- Fujicon Engineering (Singapore): manufacturer
- PULSA Bols Vibrants
- TISEC Automation: Industrial Automation Systems Provider
- Feed Rite Automation Inc.
- FMB GmbH: German manufacturer
- Riley Automation: British manufacturer
- Wibramet Piotr Sokołowski: Polish manufacturer
- Vibsort Waldemar Ziaja: Polish manufacturer
- Vibramaksan : Turkish manufacturer
- Suzhou Huilide Machine Co., Ltd.: China manufacturer, produces feeding system

== Accessories ==
- Coating: Bowl feeder coatings, such as polyurethane or flocking, minimize wear and tear, noise, and damage to parts.
- Sound enclosure/cover: A foam-lined structure that absorbs the noise created by the vibratory feeder. Reduces noise and protects against dust and contamination.
- Base plates: Enable easy mounting of the drive unit to the machine bed
- Sensors: Minimum/maximum level control on a linear track
- Hopper: Large, bulk container that stores material and regulates parts flow into the vibratory feeder system

== See also ==
- Bin picking
- Vibrating feeder
- Vision Guided Robotic Systems
