= Vibrating feeder =

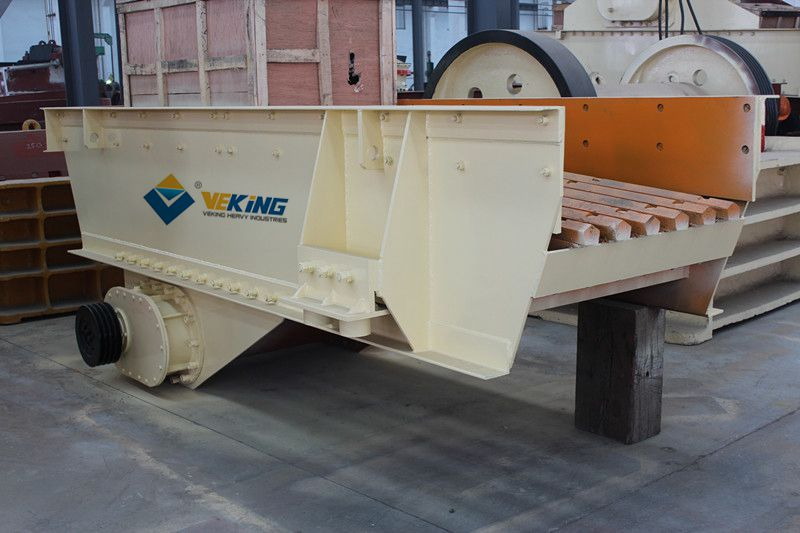
VGF series vibrating feeder

A vibrating feeder or vibratory feeder is an industrial machine used to feed material to a process or machine. Vibratory feeders use both vibration and gravity to move material. They are mainly used to transport a large number of smaller objects.

Gravity determines the direction of movement; either downwards, or down and towards one side. Vibration is used to move the material. A beltweigher is typically used to measure the material flow rate. A weigh feeder can measure and regulate the flow rate by varying the belt conveyor speed. Vibratory bowl feeders are also used for automatic feeding of small to large and differently shaped industrial parts.

== Industrial applications ==
Vibratory feeders are used for automating high-speed production lines and assembly systems in various industrial sectors, including:

- Pharmaceutical
- Automotive
- Electronic
- Food processing
- Fast Moving Consumable Goods (FMCG)
- Packaging
- Metal working
- Glass
- Foundry
- Steel
- Construction
- Recycling
- Pulp and paper
- Plastics
- Uphill (also known as salmon tables)

== See also ==
- Bowl feeder
