= Seafood =

Marine life regarded as food by humans

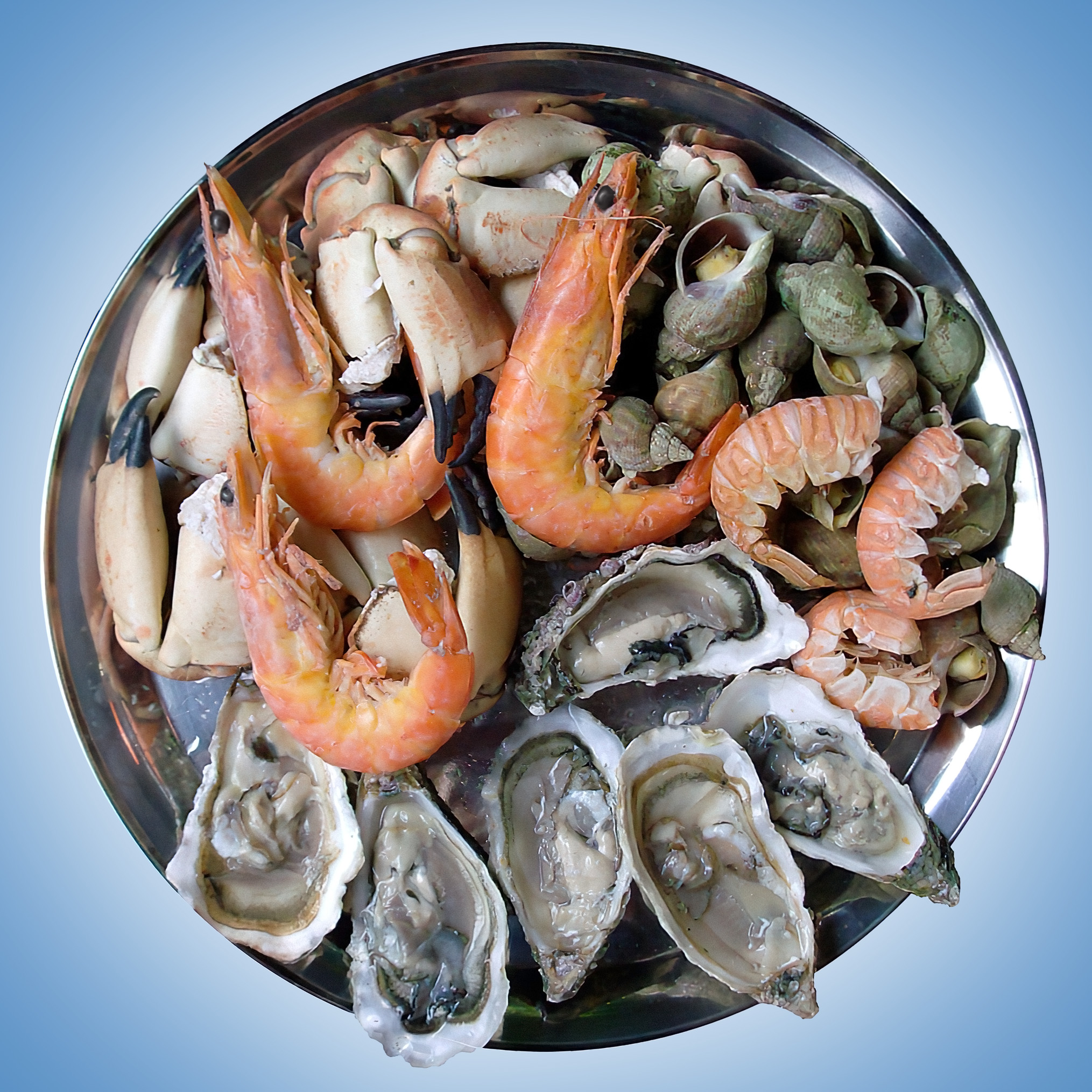
Seafood includes any form of food taken from the sea.

Seafood production

Seafood is any form of sea life regarded as food by humans, prominently including fish and shellfish. Shellfish include various species of molluscs (e.g., bivalve molluscs such as clams, oysters, and mussels, and cephalopods such as octopus and squid), crustaceans (e.g. shrimp, crabs, and lobster), and echinoderms (e.g. sea cucumbers and sea urchins). Historically, marine mammals such as cetaceans (whales and dolphins) as well as seals have been eaten as food, though that happens to a lesser extent in modern times. Edible sea plants such as some seaweeds and microalgae are widely eaten as sea vegetables around the world, especially in Asia. The Dietary Guidelines for Americans recommend eating at least 8 ounces of seafood per week as part of a healthy eating pattern, based on a 2,000-calorie diet.

Seafood is an important source of (animal) protein in many diets around the world, especially in coastal areas. Semi-vegetarians who consume seafood as the only source of meat are said to adhere to pescetarianism. The harvesting of wild seafood is usually known as fishing or hunting, while the cultivation and farming of seafood is known as aquaculture and fish farming (in the case of fish). Most of the seafood harvest is consumed by humans, but a significant proportion is used as fish food to farm other fish or rear farm animals. Some seafoods (i.e. kelp) are used as food for other plants (a fertilizer). In these ways, seafoods are used to produce further food for human consumption. Also, products such as fish oil, spirulina tablets, fish collagen, and chitin are made from seafoods. Some seafood is fed to aquarium fish, or used to feed domestic pets such as cats. A small proportion is used in medicine or is used industrially for nonfood purposes (e.g. leather).

== History ==
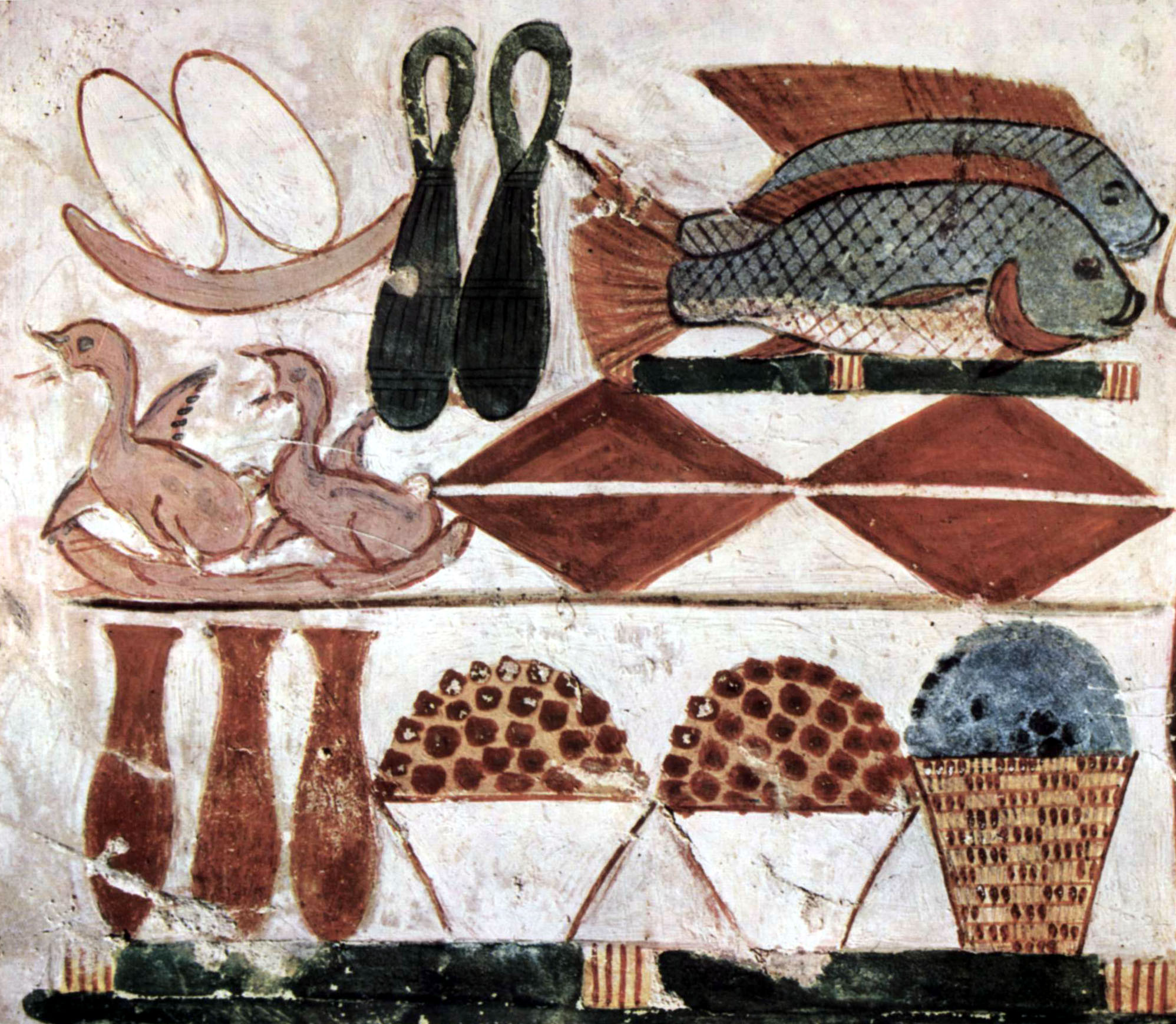
Various foods depicted in an Egyptian burial chamber, including fish, c. 1400 BCE

The harvesting, processing, and consuming of seafoods are ancient practices with archaeological evidence dating back well into the Paleolithic. Findings in a sea cave at Pinnacle Point in South Africa indicate Homo sapiens (modern humans) harvested marine life as early as 165,000 years ago, while the Neanderthals, an extinct human species contemporary with early Homo sapiens, appear to have been eating seafood at sites along the Mediterranean coast beginning around the same time. Isotopic analysis of the skeletal remains of Tianyuan man, a 40,000-year-old anatomically modern human from eastern Asia, has shown that he regularly consumed freshwater fish. Archaeology features such as shell middens, discarded fish bones, and cave paintings show that sea foods were important for survival and consumed in significant quantities. During this period, most people lived a hunter-gatherer lifestyle and were, of necessity, constantly on the move. However, early examples of permanent settlements (though not necessarily permanently occupied), such as those at Lepenski Vir, were almost always associated with fishing as a major source of food.

The ancient river Nile was full of fish; fresh and dried fish were a staple food for much of the population. The Egyptians had implements and methods for fishing and these are illustrated in tomb scenes, drawings, and papyrus documents. Some representations hint at fishing being pursued as a pastime.

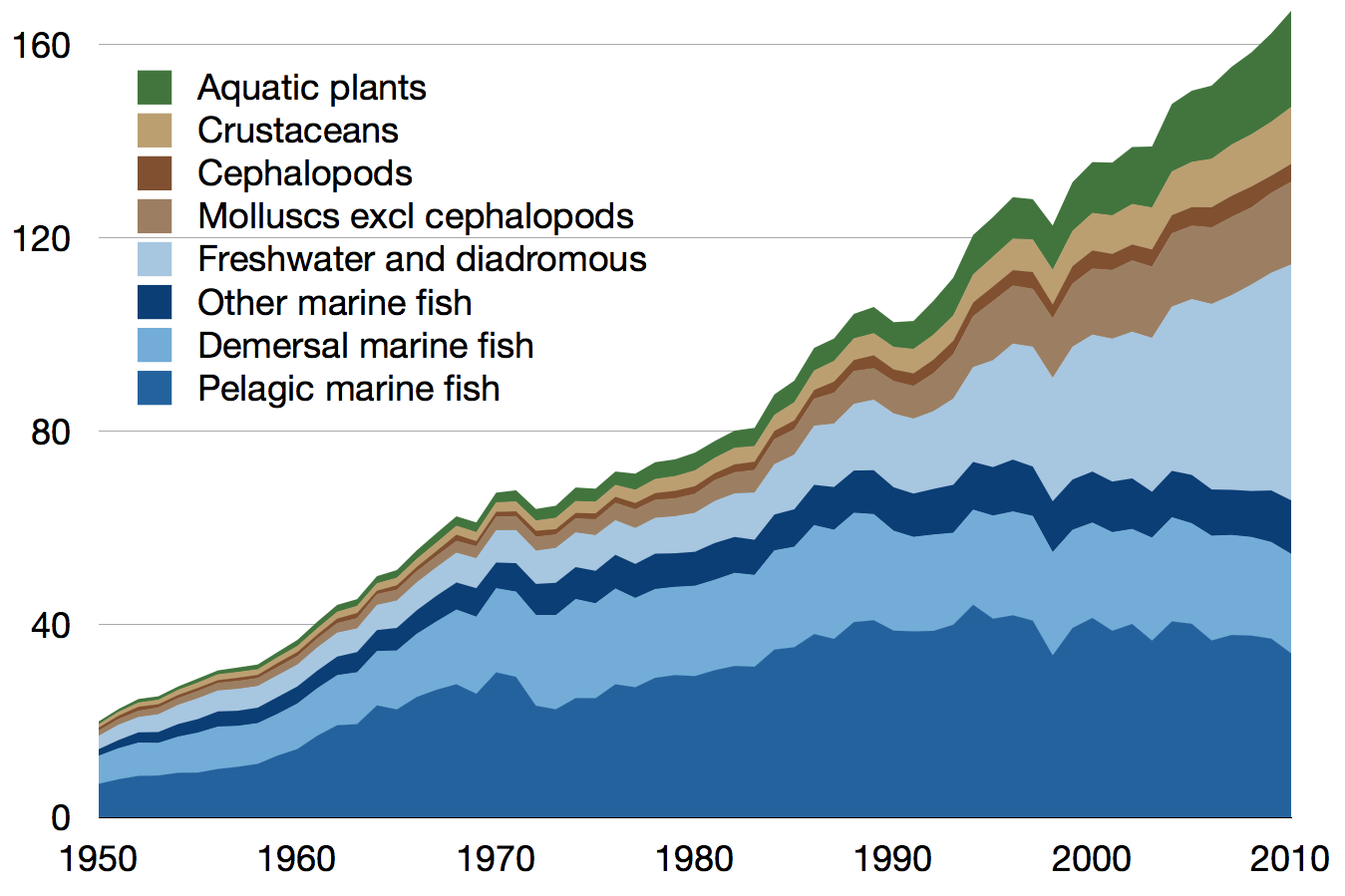
World fisheries harvest, both wild and farmed, in million tonnes, 1950–2010

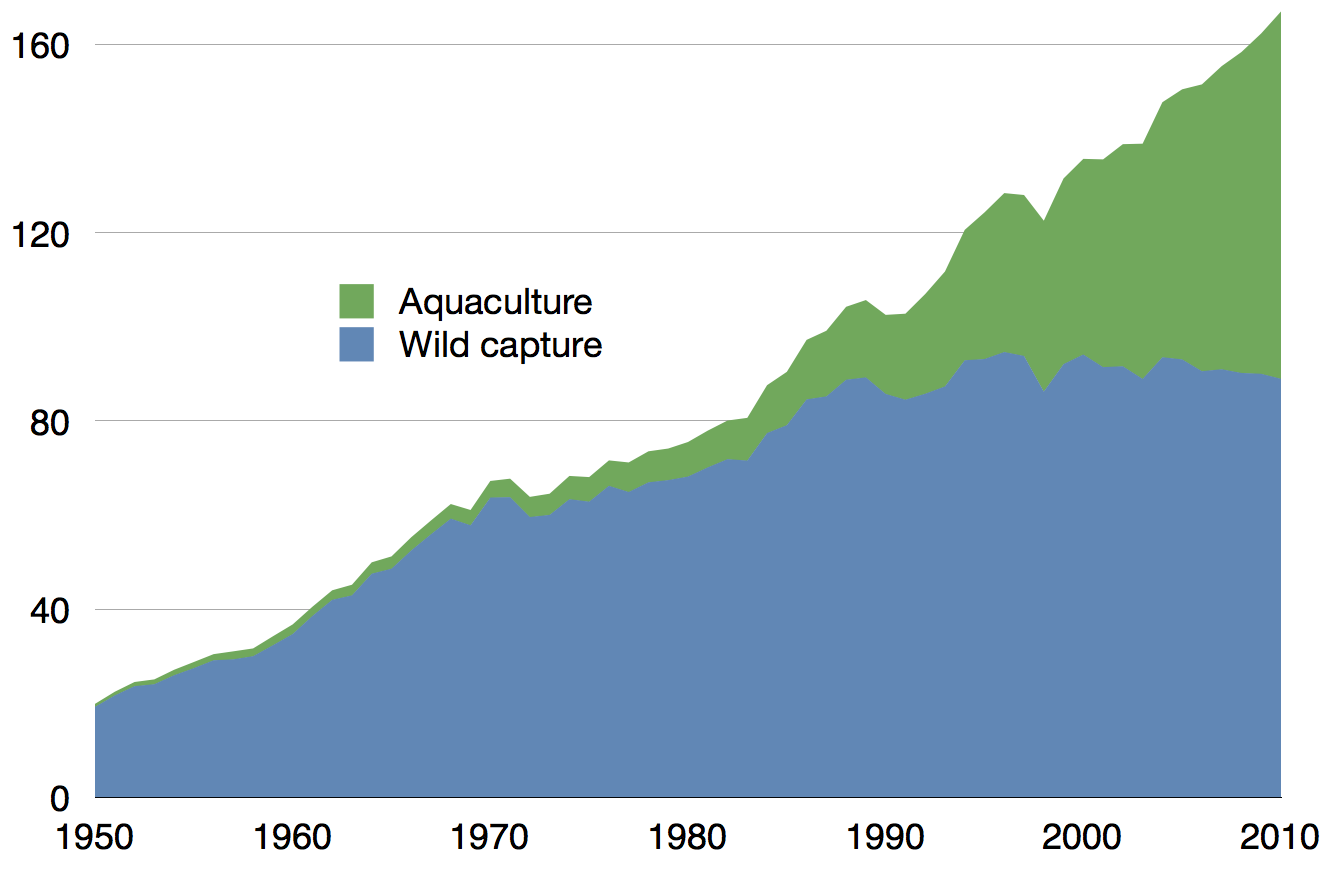
World fisheries harvest, wild capture versus aquaculture production, in million tonnes 1950–2010

Fishing scenes are rarely represented in ancient Greek culture, a reflection of the low social status of fishing. However, Oppian of Corycus, a Greek author wrote a major treatise on sea fishing, the Halieulica or Halieutika, composed between 177 and 180. This is the earliest such work to have survived to the modern day. The consumption of fish varied by the wealth and location of the household. In the Greek islands and on the coast, fresh fish and seafood (squid, octopus, and shellfish) were common. They were eaten locally but more often transported inland. Sardines and anchovies were regular fare for the citizens of Athens. They were sometimes sold fresh, but more frequently salted. A stele of the late 3rd century BCE from the small Boeotian city of Akraiphia, on Lake Copais, provides us with a list of fish prices. The cheapest was skaren (probably parrotfish) whereas Atlantic bluefin tuna was three times as expensive. Common salt water fish were yellowfin tuna, red mullet, ray, swordfish, or sturgeon, a delicacy that was eaten salted. Lake Copais itself was famous in all of Greece for its eels, celebrated by the hero of The Acharnians. Other freshwater fish were pike fish, carp, and the less appreciated catfish.

Pictorial evidence of Roman fishing comes from mosaics. At a certain time, the goatfish was considered the epitome of luxury, above all because its scales exhibit a bright red colour when it dies out of water. For this reason, these fish were occasionally allowed to die slowly at the table. There even was a recipe where this would take place in Garo, in the sauce. At the beginning of the Imperial era, however, this custom suddenly came to an end, which is why mullus in the feast of Trimalchio (see the Satyricon) could be shown as a characteristic of the parvenu, who bores his guests with an unfashionable display of dying fish.

In medieval times, seafood was less prestigious than other animal meats, and was often seen as merely an alternative to meat on fast days. Still, seafood was the mainstay of many coastal populations. Kippers made from herring caught in the North Sea could be found in markets as far away as Constantinople. While large quantities of fish were eaten fresh, a large proportion was salted, dried, and, to a lesser extent, smoked. Stockfish - cod that was split down the middle, fixed to a pole, and dried - was very common, though preparation could be time-consuming, and meant beating the dried fish with a mallet before soaking it in water. A wide range of mollusks (including oysters, mussels and scallops) were eaten by coastal and river-dwelling populations, and freshwater crayfish were seen as a desirable alternative to meat during fish days. Compared to meat, fish was much more expensive for inland populations, especially in Central Europe, and therefore not an option for most.

Modern knowledge of the reproductive cycles of aquatic species has led to the development of hatcheries and improved techniques of fish farming and aquaculture. A better understanding of the hazards of eating raw and undercooked fish and shellfish has led to improved preservation methods and processing.

== Types of seafood ==
The following table is based on the ISSCAAP classification (International Standard Statistical Classification of Aquatic Animals and Plants) used by the FAO to collect and compile fishery statistics. The production figures have been extracted from the FAO FishStat database, and include both capture from wild fisheries and aquaculture production.

Group	Image	Subgroup	Description	2010 production 1000 tonnes
fish	Fish are aquatic vertebrates which lack limbs with digits, use gills to breathe, and have heads protected by hard bone or cartilage skulls. See: Fish (food). Total for fish:			106,639
fish	Pelagic fish (Atlantic bluefin tuna)	marine pelagic	Pelagic fish live and feed near the surface or in the water column of the sea, but not on the bottom of the sea. The main seafood groups can be divided into larger predator fish (sharks, tuna, billfish, mahi-mahi, mackerel, salmon) and smaller forage fish (herring, sardines, sprats, anchovies, menhaden). The smaller forage fish feed on plankton, and can accumulate toxins to a degree. The larger predator fish feed on the forage fish, and accumulate toxins to a much higher degree than the forage fish.	33,974
fish	Demersal fish (American plaice)	marine demersal	Demersal fish live and feed on or near the bottom of the sea. Some seafood groups are cod, flatfish, grouper and stingrays. Demersal fish feed mainly on crustaceans they find on the sea floor, and are more sedentary than the pelagic fish. Pelagic fish usually have the red flesh characteristic of the powerful swimming muscles they need, while demersal fish usually have white flesh.	23,806
fish	Diadromous fish (Atlantic salmon)	diadromous	Diadromous fish are fishes which migrate between the sea and fresh water. Some seafood groups are salmon, shad, eels and lampreys. See: Salmon run.	5,348
fish	Freshwater fish (tilapia)	freshwater	Freshwater fish live in rivers, lakes, reservoirs, and ponds. Some seafood groups are carp, tilapia, catfish, bass, and trout. Generally, freshwater fish lend themselves to fish farming more readily than the ocean fish, and the larger part of the tonnage reported here refers to farmed fish.	43,511
molluscs	Molluscs (from the Latin molluscus, meaning soft) are invertebrates with soft bodies that are not segmented like crustaceans. Bivalves and gastropods are protected by a calcareous shell which grows as the mollusc grows. Total for molluscs:			20,797
molluscs	Bivalve	bivalves	Bivalves, sometimes referred to as clams, have a protective shell in two hinged parts. A valve is the name used for the protective shell of a bivalve, so bivalve literally means two shells. Important seafood bivalves include oysters, scallops, mussels and cockles. Most of these are filter feeders which bury themselves in sediment on the seabed where they are safe from predation. Others lie on the sea floor or attach themselves to rocks or other hard surfaces. Some, such as scallops, can swim. Bivalves have long been a part of the diet of coastal communities. Oysters were cultured in ponds by the Romans and mariculture has more recently become an important source of bivalves for food.	12,585
molluscs	Empty shell of an abalone	gastropods	Aquatic gastropods, also known as sea snails, are univalves which means they have a protective shell that is in a single piece. Gastropod literally means stomach-foot, because they appear to crawl on their stomachs. Common seafood groups are abalone, conch, limpets, whelks and periwinkles.	526
molluscs	Octopus	cephalopods	Cephalopods, except for nautilus, are not protected by an external shell. Cephalopod literally means head-foots, because they have limbs which appear to issue from their head. They have excellent vision and high intelligence. Cephalopods propel themselves with a water jet and lay down "smoke screens" with ink. Examples are octopus, squid and cuttlefish. They are eaten in many cultures. Depending on the species, the arms and sometimes other body parts are prepared in various ways. Octopus must be boiled properly to rid it of slime, smell, and residual ink. Squid are popular in Japan. In Mediterranean countries and in English-speaking countries squid are often referred to as calamari. Cuttlefish is less eaten than squid, though it is popular in Italy and dried, shredded cuttlefish is a snack food in East Asia. See: Squid (food), Octopus (food).	3,653
molluscs		other	Molluscs not included above are chitons.	4,033
crustaceans	Crustaceans (from Latin crusta, meaning crust) are invertebrates with segmented bodies protected by hard crusts (shells or exoskeletons), usually made of chitin and structured somewhat like a knight's armour. The shells do not grow, and must periodically be shed or moulted. Usually two legs or limbs issue from each segment. Most commercial crustaceans are decapods, that is they have ten legs, and have compound eyes set on stalks. Their shell turns pink or red when cooked. Total for crustaceans:			11,827
crustaceans	Northern prawn	shrimps	Shrimp and prawns are small, slender, stalk-eyed ten-legged crustaceans with long spiny rostrums. They are widespread, and can be found near the seafloor of most coasts and estuaries, as well as in rivers and lakes. They play important roles in the food chain. There are numerous species, and usually there is a species adapted to any particular habitat. Any small crustacean which resembles a shrimp tends to be called one. See: shrimp (food), shrimp fishery, shrimp farming, freshwater prawn farming.	6,917
crustaceans	Mud crab	crabs	Crabs are stalk-eyed ten-legged crustaceans, usually walk sideways, and have grasping claws as their front pair of limbs. They have small abdomens, short antennae, and a short carapace that is wide and flat. Also usually included are king crabs and coconut crabs, even if these belongs to a different group of decapods than the true crabs. See: crab fisheries.	1,679
crustaceans	Clawed lobster	lobsters	Clawed lobsters and spiny lobsters are stalk-eyed ten-legged crustaceans with long abdomens. The clawed lobster has large asymmetrical claws for its front pair of limbs, one for crushing and one for cutting (pictured). The spiny lobster lacks the large claws, but has a long, spiny antennae and a spiny carapace. Lobsters are larger than most shrimp or crabs. See: lobster fishing.	281
crustaceans	Northern krill	krill	Krill resemble small shrimp, however they have external gills and more than ten legs (swimming plus feeding and grooming legs). They are found in oceans around the world where they filter feed in huge pelagic swarms. Like shrimp, they are an important part of the marine food chain, converting phytoplankton into a form larger animals can consume. Each year, larger animals eat half the estimated biomass of krill (about 600 million tonnes). Humans consume krill in Japan and Russia, but most of the krill harvest is used to make fish feed and for extracting oil. Krill oil contains omega-3 fatty acids, similar to fish oil. See: Krill fishery.	215
crustaceans		other	Crustaceans not included above are gooseneck barnacles, giant barnacle, mantis shrimp and brine shrimp.	1,359
other aquatic animals	Total for other aquatic animals:			1,409+
other aquatic animals	Dolphin Fluke of a whale	aquatic mammals	Marine mammals form a diverse group of 128 species that rely on the ocean for their existence. Whale meat is still harvested from legal, non-commercial hunts. About one thousand long-finned pilot whales are still killed annually. Japan has resumed hunting for whales, which they call "research whaling". In modern Japan, two cuts of whale meat are usually distinguished: the belly meat and the more valued tail or fluke meat. Fluke meat can sell for $200 per kilogram, three times the price of belly meat. Fin whales are particularly desired because they are thought to yield the best quality fluke meat. In Taiji in Japan and parts of Scandinavia such as the Faroe Islands, dolphins are traditionally considered food, and are killed in harpoon or drive hunts. Ringed seals are still an important food source for the people of Nunavut and are also hunted and eaten in Alaska. The meat of sea mammals can be high in mercury, and may pose health dangers to humans when consumed. The FAO records only the reported numbers of aquatic mammals harvested, and not the tonnage. In 2010, it reported 2500 whales, 12,000 dolphins and 182,000 seals. See: marine mammals as food, whale meat, seal hunting.	?
other aquatic animals	Sea cucumber	aquatic reptiles	Sea turtles have long been valued as food in many parts of the world. Fifth century BC Chinese texts describe sea turtles as exotic delicacies. Sea turtles are caught worldwide, although in many countries it is illegal to hunt most species. Many coastal communities around the world depend on sea turtles as a source of protein, often gathering sea turtle eggs, and keeping captured sea turtles alive on their backs until needed for consumption. Most species of sea turtle are now endangered, and some are critically endangered.	296+
other aquatic animals	Sea cucumber	echinoderms	Echinoderms are headless invertebrates, found on the seafloor in all oceans and at all depths. They are not found in fresh water. They usually have a five-pointed radial symmetry, and move, breathe and perceive with their retractable tube feet. They are covered with a calcareous and spiky test or skin. The name echinoderm comes from the Greek ekhinos meaning hedgehog, and dermatos meaning skin. Echinoderms used for seafood include sea cucumbers, sea urchins, and occasionally starfish. Wild sea cucumbers are caught by divers and in China they are farmed commercially in artificial ponds. The gonads of both male and female sea urchins, usually called sea urchin roe or corals, are delicacies in many parts of the world.	373
other aquatic animals	Rehydrated jellyfish strips	jellyfish	Jellyfish are soft and gelatinous, with a body shaped like an umbrella or bell which pulsates for locomotion. They have long, trailing tentacles with stings for capturing prey. They are found free-swimming in the water column in all oceans, and are occasionally found in freshwater. Jellyfish must be dried within hours to prevent spoiling. In Japan they are regarded as a delicacy. Traditional processing methods are carried out by a jellyfish master. This involve a 20 to 40-day multi-phase procedure which starts with removing the gonads and mucous membranes. The umbrella and oral arms are then treated with a mixture of table salt and alum, and compressed. Processing reduces liquefaction, odor, the growth of spoilage organisms, and makes the jellyfish drier and more acidic, producing a crisp and crunchy texture. Only scyphozoan jellyfish belonging to the order Rhizostomeae are harvested for food; about 12 of the approximately 85 species. Most of the harvest takes place in southeast Asia.	404
other aquatic animals	Sea squirt	other	Aquatic animals not included above, such as waterfowl, frogs, spoon worms, peanut worms, palolo worms, lamp shells, lancelets, sea anemones and sea squirts (pictured).	336
aquatic plants and microphytes	Total for aquatic plants and microphytes:			19,893
aquatic plants and microphytes	Seaweed/sea urchin soup Sea grapes	seaweed	Seaweed is a loose colloquial term which lacks a formal definition. Broadly, the term is applied to the larger, macroscopic forms of algae, as opposed to microalga. Examples of seaweed groups are the multicellular red, brown and green algae. Edible seaweeds usually contain high amounts of fibre and, in contrast to terrestrial plants, contain a complete protein. Seaweeds are used extensively as food in coastal cuisines around the world. Seaweed has been a part of diets in China, Japan, and Korea since prehistoric times. Seaweed is also consumed in many traditional European societies, in Iceland and western Norway, the Atlantic coast of France, northern and western Ireland, Wales and some coastal parts of South West England, as well as Nova Scotia and Newfoundland. See: edible seaweed, seaweed farming, aquaculture of giant kelp, laverbread.	
aquatic plants and microphytes	Spirulina tablets	microphytes	Microphytes are microscopic organisms, and can be algal, bacterial or fungal. Microalgae are another type of aquatic plant, and includes species that can be consumed by humans and animals. Some species of aquatic bacteria can also be used as seafood, such as spirulina (pictured in tablet form), a type of cyanobacteria. See: culture of microalgae in hatcheries.	
aquatic plants and microphytes	Lotus bud	aquatic plants	Edible aquatic plants are flowering plants and ferns that have adapted to a life in water. Known examples are duck potato, water chestnut, cattail, watercress, lotus and nardoo.	
Total production (thousand tonnes)				168,447

== Processing ==
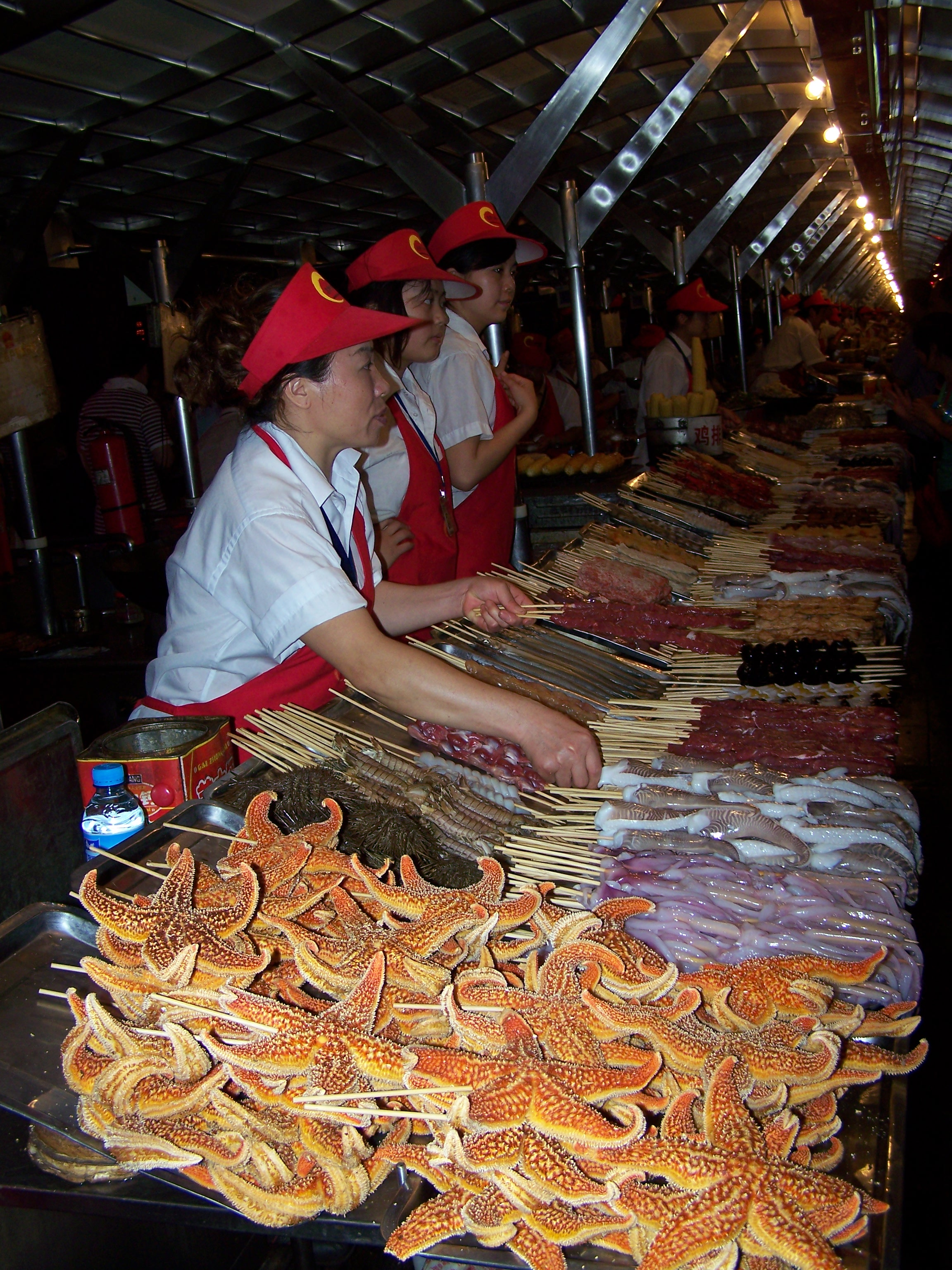
Deep-fried starfish for sale as "food-on-a-stick", Beijing

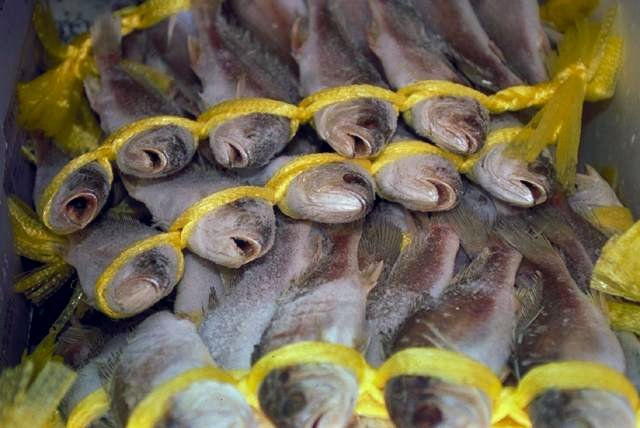
Fish at an Asian supermarket in Virginia, U.S.

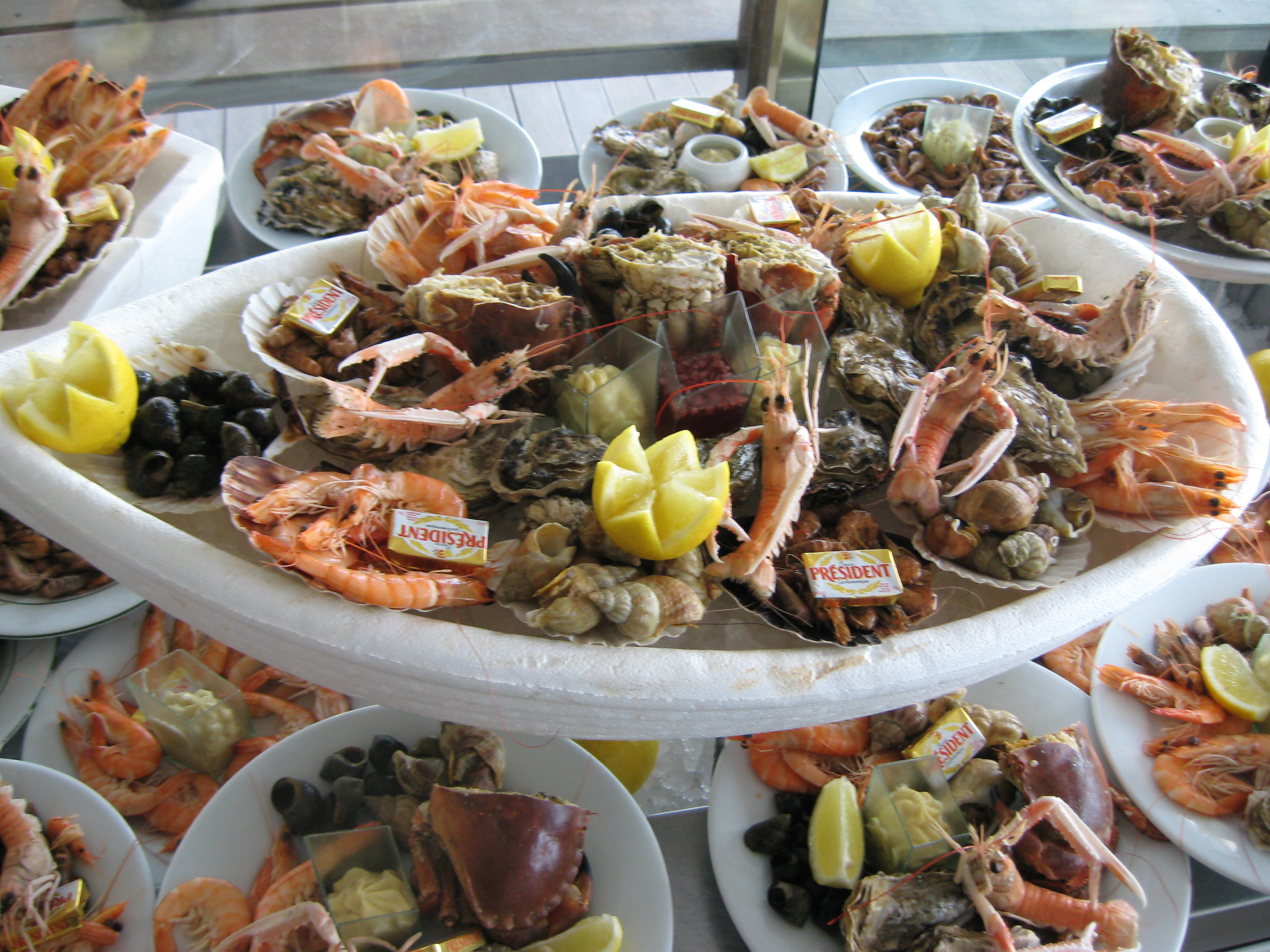
Seafood in Étretat, France

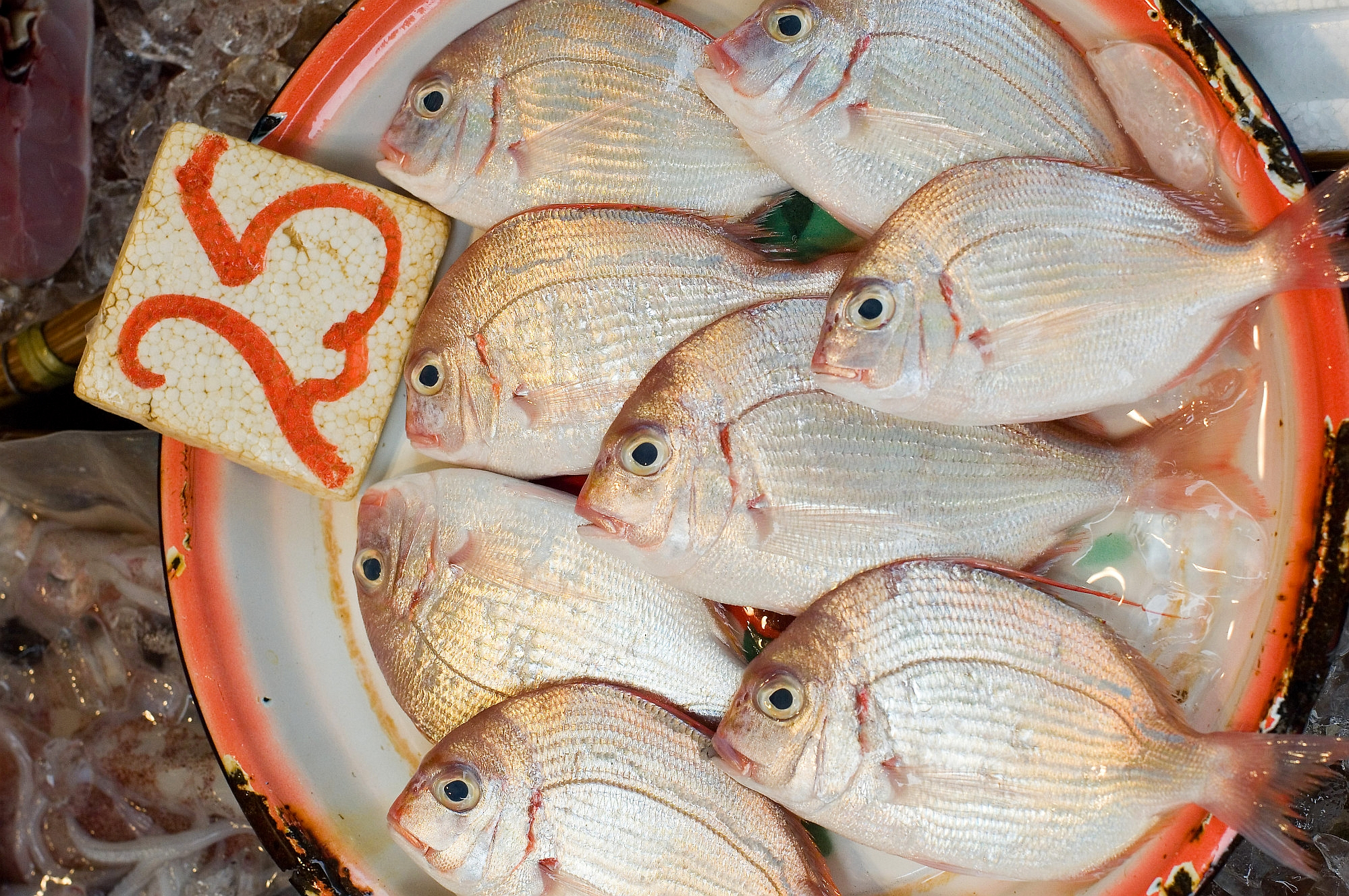
Fish for sale in a market in Hong Kong

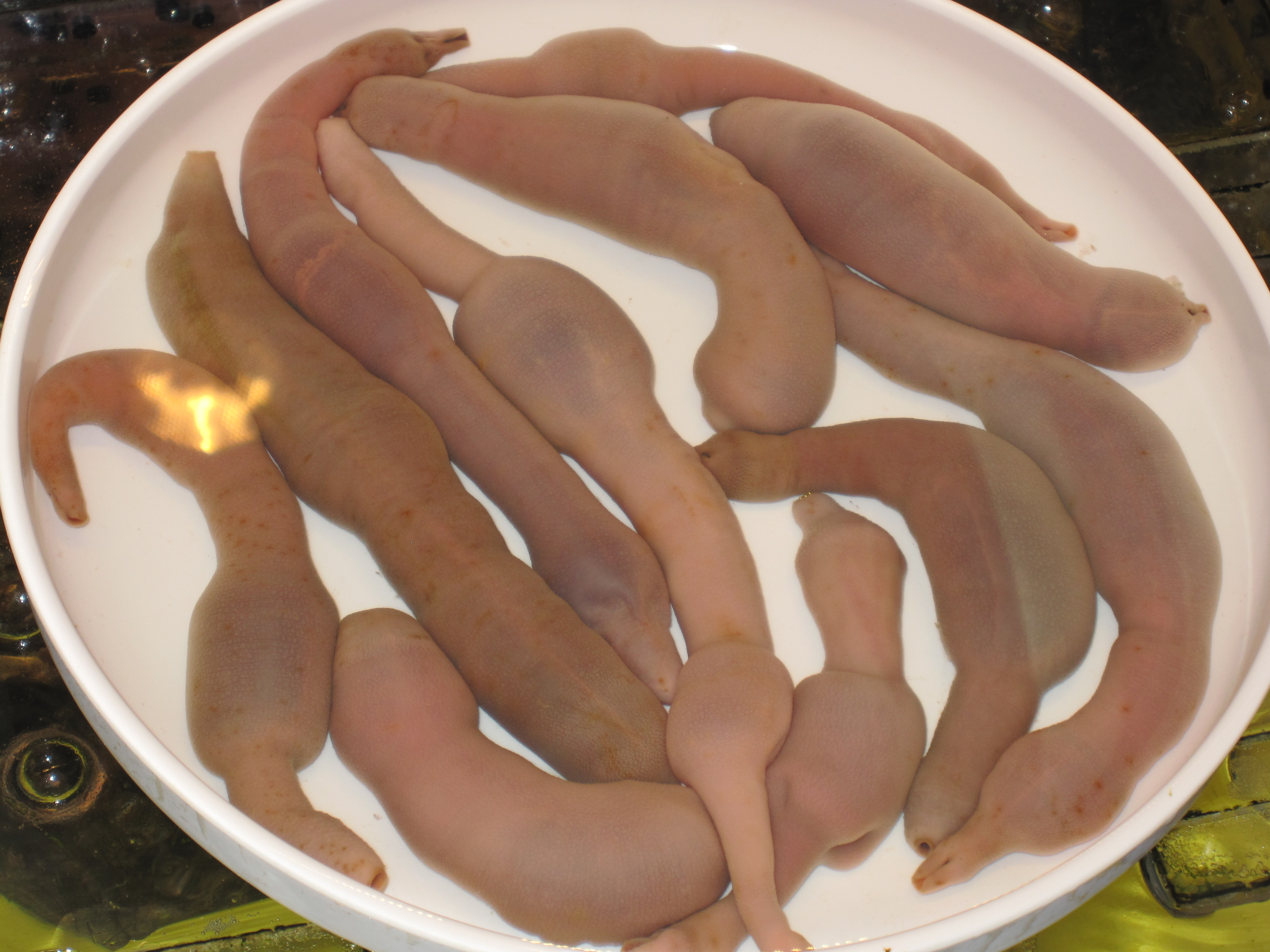
Penis fish (a spoon worm) for sale in a market, South Korea

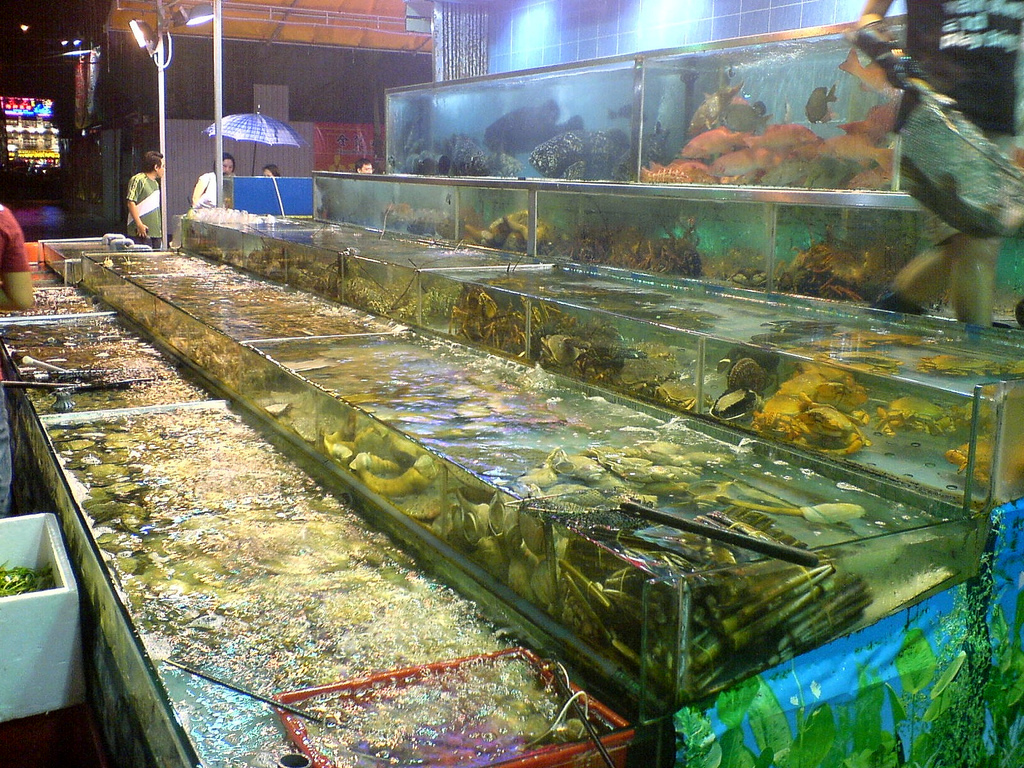
Seafood tanks in a Cantonese restaurant

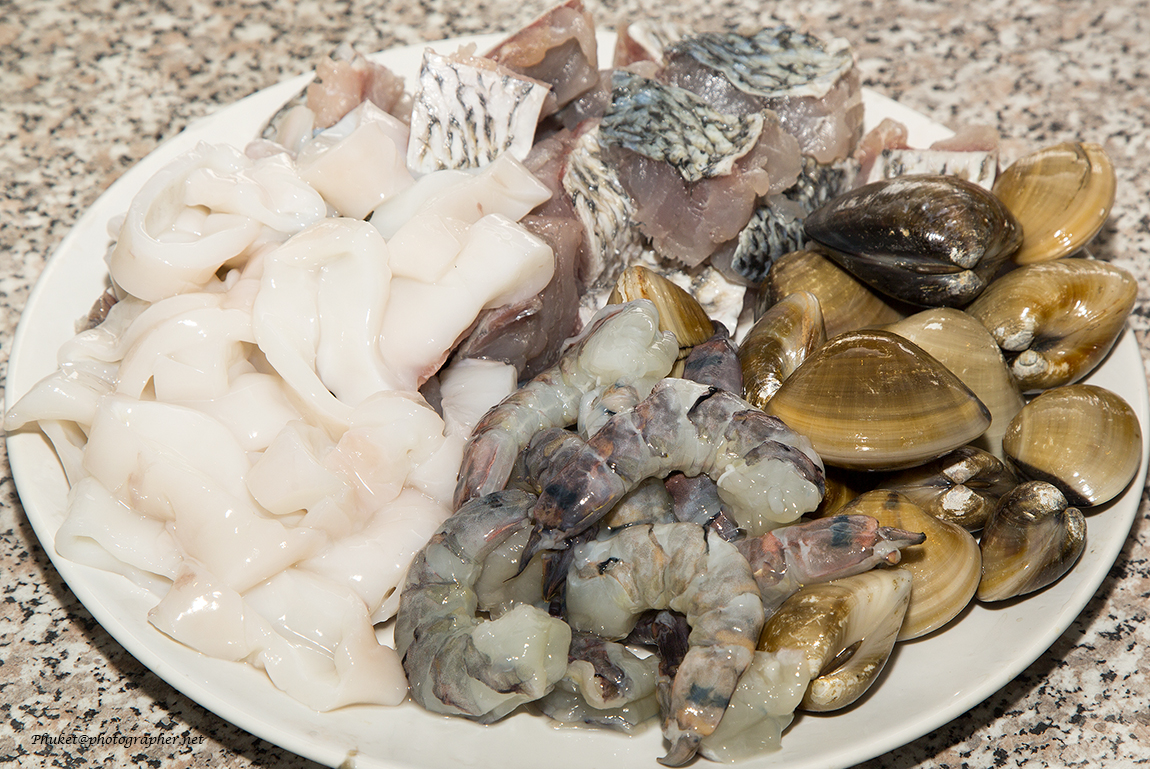
Raw seafoods

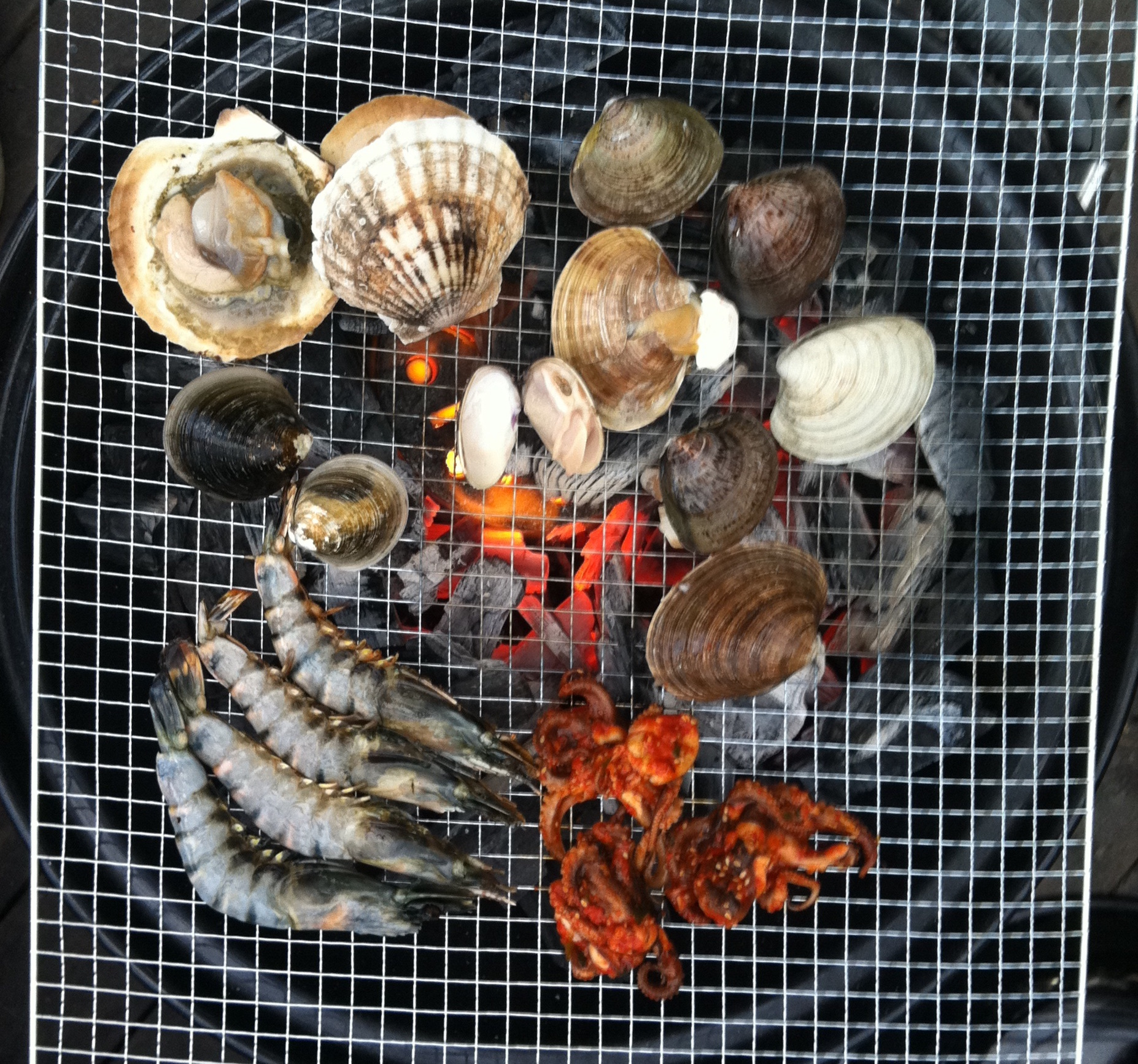
Grilling seafood

Fish is a highly perishable product: the "fishy" smell of dead fish is due to the breakdown of amino acids into biogenic amines and ammonia.

Live food fish are often transported in tanks at high expense for an international market that prefers its seafood killed immediately before it is cooked. Delivery of live fish without water is also being explored. While some seafood restaurants keep live fish in aquaria for display purposes or cultural beliefs, the majority of live fish are kept for dining customers. The live food fish trade in Hong Kong, for example, is estimated to have driven imports of live food fish to more than 15,000 tonnes in 2000. Worldwide sales that year were estimated at US$400 million, according to the World Resources Institute.

If the cool chain has not been adhered to correctly, food products generally decay and become harmful before the validity date printed on the package. As the potential harm for a consumer when eating rotten fish is much larger than for example with dairy products, the U.S. Food and Drug Administration (FDA) has introduced regulation in the USA requiring the use of a time temperature indicator on certain fresh chilled seafood products.

Because fresh fish is highly perishable, it must be eaten promptly or discarded; it can be kept for only a short time. In many countries, fresh fish are filleted and displayed for sale on a bed of crushed ice or refrigerated. Fresh fish is most commonly found near bodies of water, but the advent of refrigerated train and truck transportation has made fresh fish more widely available inland.

Long term preservation of fish is accomplished in a variety of ways. The oldest and still most widely used techniques are drying and salting. Desiccation (complete drying) is commonly used to preserve fish such as cod. Partial drying and salting are popular for the preservation of fish like herring and mackerel. Fish such as salmon, tuna, and herring are cooked and canned. Most fish are filleted before canning, but some small fish (e.g. sardines) are only decapitated and gutted before canning.

== Consumption ==
Fish and seafood consumption per capita

Seafood is consumed all over the world; it provides the world's prime source of high-quality protein: 14–16% of the animal protein consumed worldwide, with over one billion people reliant on seafood as their primary source of animal protein. Fish is among the most common food allergens.

Since 1960, annual global seafood consumption has more than doubled to over 20 kg per capita. Among the top consumers are Korea (78.5 kg per head), Norway (66.6 kg) and Portugal (61.5 kg).

The UK Food Standards Agency recommends that at least two portions of seafood should be consumed each week, one of which should be oil-rich. There are over 100 different types of seafood available around the coast of the UK.

Oil-rich fish such as mackerel or herring are rich in long-chain omega-3 oils. These oils are found in every cell of the human body, and are required for human biological functions such as brain functionality.

Whitefish such as haddock and cod are very low in fat and calories which, combined with oily fish rich in omega-3 such as mackerel, sardines, fresh tuna, salmon and trout, can help to protect against coronary heart disease, as well as helping to develop strong bones and teeth.

Shellfish are particularly rich in zinc, which is essential for healthy skin and muscles as well as fertility. Casanova reputedly ate 50 oysters a day.

== Texture and taste ==
Over 33,000 species of fish and many more marine invertebrate species have been identified. Bromophenols, which are produced by marine algae, give marine animals an odor and taste that is absent from freshwater fish and invertebrates. Also, a chemical substance called dimethylsulfoniopropionate (DMSP) that is found in red and green algae is transferred into animals in the marine food chain. When broken down, dimethyl sulfide (DMS) is produced, and is often released during food preparation when fresh fish and shellfish are heated. In small quantities it creates a specific smell one associates with the ocean, but in larger quantities gives the impression of rotten seaweed and old fish. Another molecule known as TMAO occurs in fishes and gives them a distinct smell. It also exists in freshwater species, but becomes more numerous in the cells of an animal the deeper it lives, so fish from the deeper parts of the ocean have a stronger taste than species that live in shallow water. Eggs from seaweed contain sex pheromones called dictyopterenes, which are meant to attract the sperm. These pheromones are also found in edible seaweeds, which contributes to their aroma.

Common species used as seafood
	Mild flavour	Moderate flavour	Full flavour
Delicate texture	basa, flounder, hake, scup, smelt, rainbow trout, hardshell clam, blue crab, peekytoe crab, spanner crab, cuttlefish, eastern oyster, Pacific oyster	anchovy, herring, lingcod, moi, orange roughy, Atlantic Ocean perch, Lake Victoria perch, yellow perch, European oyster, sea urchin	Atlantic mackerel
Medium texture	black sea bass, European sea bass, hybrid striped bass, bream, cod, drum, haddock, hoki, Alaska pollock, rockfish, pink salmon, snapper, tilapia, turbot, walleye, lake whitefish, wolffish, hardshell clam, surf clam, cockle, Jonah crab, snow crab, crayfish, bay scallop, Chinese white shrimp	sablefish, Atlantic salmon, coho salmon, skate, dungeness crab, king crab, blue mussel, greenshell mussel, pink shrimp	escolar, chinook salmon, chum salmon, American shad
Firm texture	Arctic char, carp, catfish, dory, grouper, halibut, monkfish, pompano, Dover sole, sturgeon, tilefish, wahoo, yellowtail, Abalone, conch, stone crab, American lobster, spiny lobster, octopus, black tiger shrimp, freshwater shrimp, gulf shrimp, Pacific white shrimp, squid	barramundi, cusk, dogfish, kingklip, mahimahi, opah, mako shark, swordfish, albacore tuna, yellowfin tuna, geoduck clam, squat lobster, sea scallop, rock shrimp	barracuda, Chilean sea bass, cobia, croaker, eel, blue marlin, mullet, sockeye salmon, bluefin tuna

== Health benefits ==
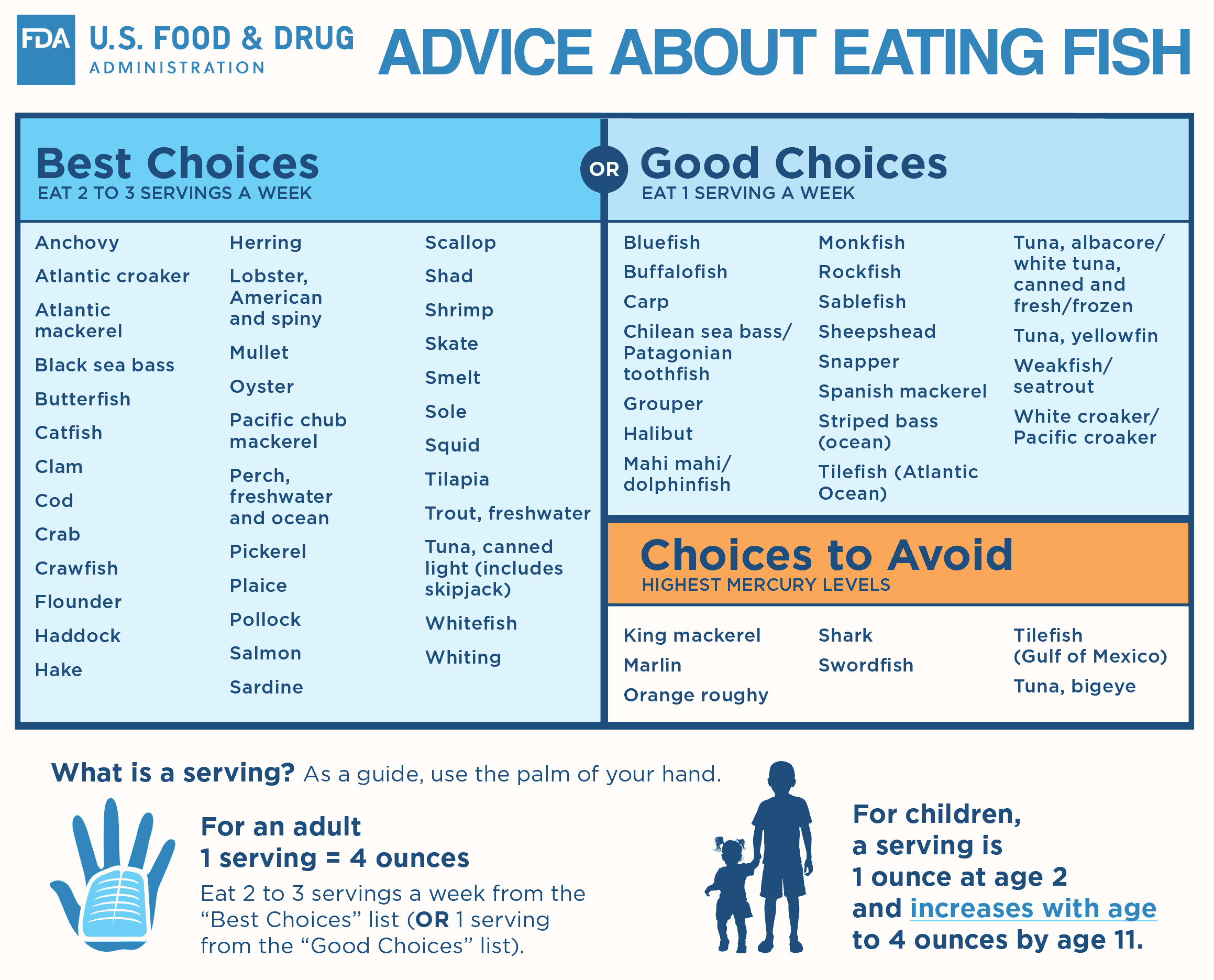
The FDA recommends moderate consumption of fish as part of a healthy and balanced diet

There is broad scientific consensus that the acids DHA and EPA (both of which are highly prevalent in seafood) are beneficial to neurodevelopment and cognition, especially at young ages. The United Nations' Food and Agriculture Organization has described fish as "nature's superfood". Seafood consumption is associated with improved neurodevelopment during pregnancy and early childhood.

Fish consumption is associated with a decreased risk of dementia, lung cancer, and stroke, as well as a more tenuous link to reduced mortality from coronary heart disease. A 2020 umbrella review concluded that fish consumption reduces all-cause mortality, cancer, cardiovascular disease, stroke, and other outcomes, while suggesting that two to four servings per week is generally safe. However, two other umbrella reviews found no statistically significant association between fish consumption and cancer risks, and have cautioned researchers when it comes to interpreting this reported association as the quality of evidence is low.

The parts of fish containing essential fats and micronutrients, often cited as the primary health benefits of eating seafood, are frequently discarded in the developed world. Micronutrients including calcium, iodine, potassium, selenium, and zinc are found in their highest concentrations in the head, intestines, bones, and scales of fish.

Government recommendations promote moderate consumption of fish. The American Food and Drug Administration recommends moderate consumption of fish (4 oz weekly for children and 8–12 oz weekly for adults) as part of a healthy and balanced diet. The British National Health Service gives similar advice, recommending at least two portions (about 10 oz) of fish weekly. The Chinese National Health Commission recommends slightly more, advising 10–20 oz of fish weekly.

== Health hazards ==
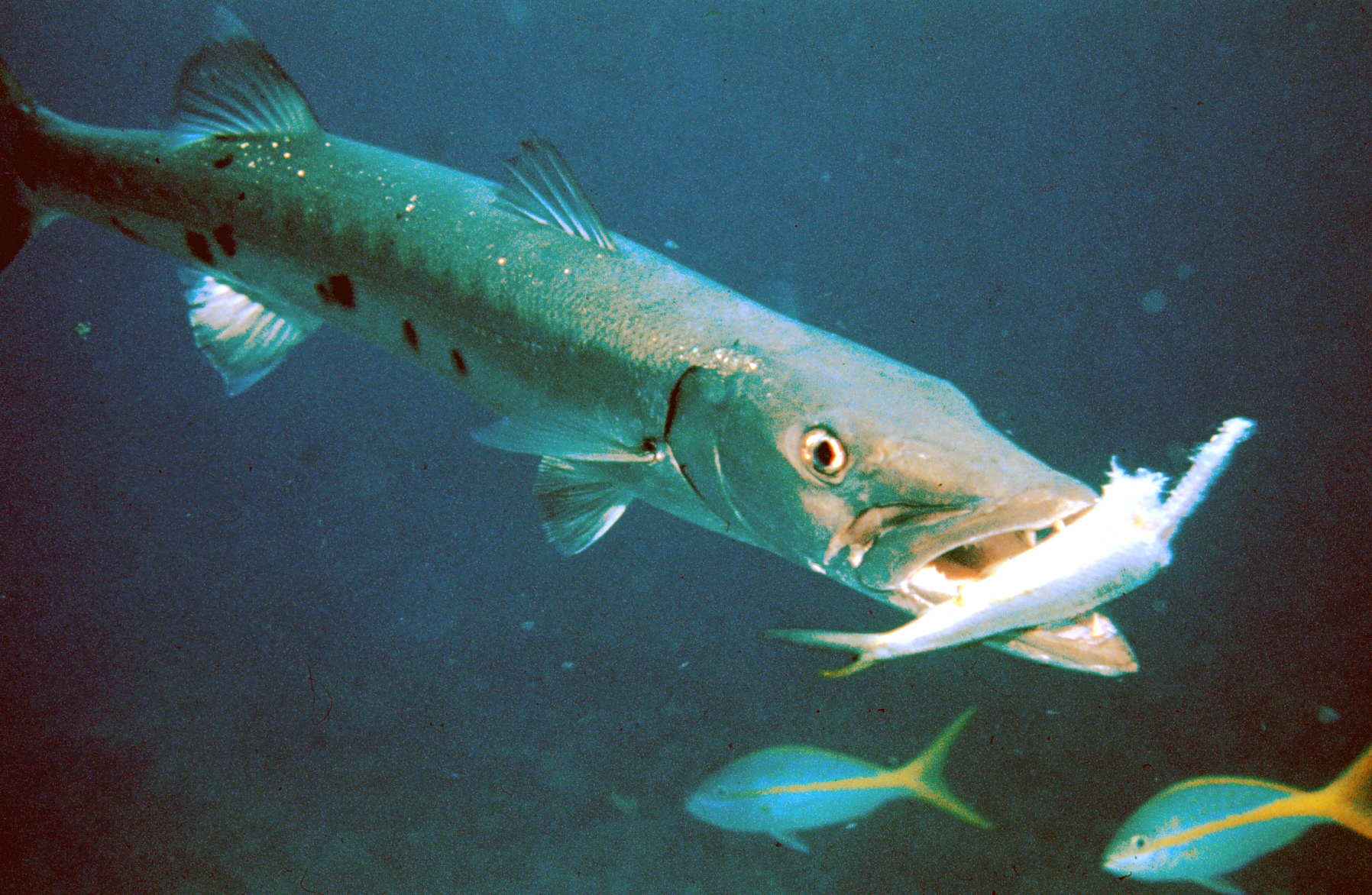
Barracuda found in Florida are avoided due to a high risk of ciguatera. The same fish found in Belize presents a lesser risk due to the lower prevalence of ciguatera-causing dinoflagellates in the Caribbean. Thus, knowing a fish's origin and life history is essential to determining its health hazards.

Organic and inorganic compounds including methylmercury, microplastics, and polychlorinated biphenyls (PCBs) can bioaccumulate to dangerous levels in apex predators like swordfish and marlin.

There are numerous factors to consider when evaluating health hazards in seafood. These concerns include marine toxins, microbes, foodborne illness, radionuclide contamination, and man-made pollutants. Shellfish are among the more common food allergens. Most of these dangers can be mitigated or avoided with accurate knowledge of when and where seafood is caught. However, consumers have limited access to relevant and actionable information in this regard and the seafood industry's systemic problems with mislabelling make decisions about what is safe even more fraught.

Ciguatera fish poisoning (CFP) is an illness resulting from consuming toxins produced by dinoflagellates which bioaccumulate in the liver, roe, head, and intestines of reef fish. It is the most common disease associated with seafood consumption and poses the greatest risk to consumers. The population of plankton that produces these toxins varies significantly over time and location, as seen in red tides. Evaluating the risk of ciguatera in any given fish requires specific knowledge of its origin and life history, information that is often inaccurate or unavailable. While ciguatera is relatively widespread compared to other seafood-related health hazards (up to 50,000 people suffer from ciguatera every year), mortality is very low.

Scombroid food poisoning, is also a seafood illness. It is typically caused by eating fish high in histamine from being stored or processed improperly.

Fish and shellfish have a natural tendency to concentrate inorganic and organic toxins and pollutants in their bodies, including methylmercury, a highly toxic organic compound of mercury, polychlorinated biphenyls (PCBs), and microplastics. Species of fish that are high on the food chain, such as shark, swordfish, king mackerel, albacore tuna, and tilefish contain higher concentrations of these bioaccumulates. This is because bioaccumulates are stored in the muscle tissues of fish, and when a predatory fish eats another fish, it assumes the entire body burden of bioaccumulates in the consumed fish. Thus species that are high on the food chain amass body burdens of bioaccumulates that can be ten times higher than the species they consume. This process is called biomagnification.

Man-made disasters can cause localized hazards in seafood which may spread widely via piscine food chains. The first occurrence of widespread mercury poisoning in humans occurred this way in the 1950s in Minamata, Japan. Wastewater from a nearby chemical factory released methylmercury that accumulated in fish which were consumed by humans. Severe mercury poisoning is now known as Minamata disease. The 2011 Fukushima Daiichi Nuclear Power Plant disaster and 1947–1991 Marshall Islands nuclear bomb testing led to dangerous radionuclide contamination of local sea life which, in the latter case, remained as of 2008.

A widely cited study in JAMA which synthesized government and MEDLINE reports, and meta-analyses to evaluate risks from methylmercury, dioxins, and polychlorinated biphenyls to cardiovascular health and links between fish consumption and neurologic outcomes concluded that:

"The benefits of modest fish consumption (1-2 servings/wk) outweigh the risks among adults and, excepting a few selected fish species, among women of childbearing age. Avoidance of modest fish consumption due to confusion regarding risks and benefits could result in thousands of excess CHD [congenital heart disease] deaths annually and suboptimal neurodevelopment in children."

== Mislabelling ==
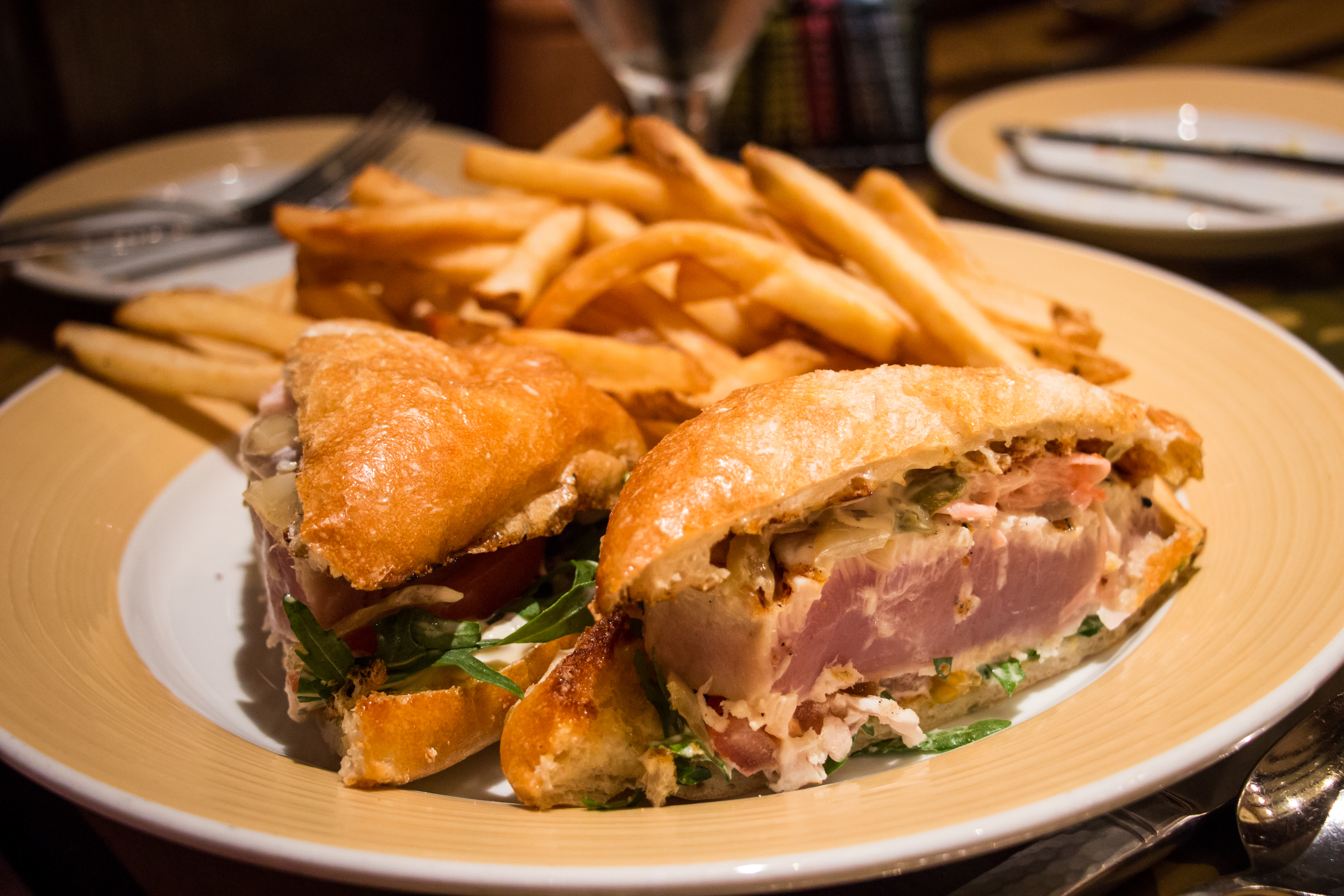
Escolar is sometimes difficult to distinguish from tuna when cooked. Unlike tuna, escolar is associated with keriorrhea and severe cramping following consumption. In many restaurants, most fish labeled as tuna, white tuna, or albacore are mislabeled escolar.

Due to the wide array of options in the seafood marketplace, seafood is far more susceptible to mislabeling than terrestrial food. There are more than 1,700 species of seafood in the United States' consumer marketplace, 80–90% of which are imported and less than 1% of which are tested for fraud. However, more recent research into seafood imports and consumption patterns among consumers in the United States suggests that 35%–38% of seafood products are of domestic origin. consumption suggests Estimates of mislabelled seafood in the United States range from 33% in general up to 86% for particular species.

Byzantine supply chains, frequent bycatch, brand naming, species substitution, and inaccurate ecolabels all contribute to confusion for the consumer. A 2013 study by Oceana found that one third of seafood sampled from the United States was incorrectly labeled. Snapper and tuna were particularly susceptible to mislabelling, and seafood substitution was the most common type of fraud. Another type of mislabelling is short-weighting, where practices such as overglasing or soaking can misleadingly increase the apparent weight of the fish. For supermarket shoppers, many seafood products are unrecognisable fillets. Without sophisticated DNA testing, there is no foolproof method to identify a fish species without their head, skin, and fins. This creates easy opportunities to substitute cheap products for expensive ones, a form of economic fraud.

Beyond financial concerns, significant health risks arise from hidden pollutants and marine toxins in an already fraught marketplace. Seafood fraud has led to widespread keriorrhea due to mislabeled escolar, mercury poisoning from products marketed as safe for pregnant women, and hospitalisation and neurological damage due to mislabeled pufferfish. For example, a 2014 study published in PLOS One found that 15% of MSC certified Patagonian toothfish originated from uncertified and mercury polluted fisheries. These fishery-stock substitutions had 100% more mercury than their genuine counterparts, "vastly exceeding" limits in Canada, New Zealand, and Australia.

== Sustainability ==
Research into population trends of various species of seafood is pointing to a global collapse of seafood species by 2048. Such a collapse would occur due to pollution and overfishing, threatening oceanic ecosystems, according to some researchers.

A major international scientific study released in November 2006 in the journal Science found that about one-third of all fishing stocks worldwide have collapsed (with a collapse being defined as a decline to less than 10% of their maximum observed abundance), and that if current trends continue all fish stocks worldwide will collapse within fifty years. In July 2009, Boris Worm of Dalhousie University, the author of the November 2006 study in Science, co-authored an update on the state of the world's fisheries with one of the original study's critics, Ray Hilborn of the University of Washington at Seattle. The new study found that through good fisheries management techniques even depleted fish stocks can be revived and made commercially viable again. An analysis published in August 2020 indicates that seafood could theoretically increase sustainably by 36–74% by 2050 compared to current yields and that whether or not these production potentials are realised sustainably depends on several factors "such as policy reforms, technological innovation, and the extent of future shifts in demand".

The FAO State of World Fisheries and Aquaculture 2004 report estimates that in 2003, of the main fish stocks or groups of resources for which assessment information is available, "approximately one-quarter were overexploited, depleted or recovering from depletion (16%, 7% and 1% respectively) and needed rebuilding."

The National Fisheries Institute, a trade advocacy group representing the United States seafood industry, disagree. They claim that currently observed declines in fish populations are due to natural fluctuations and that enhanced technologies will eventually alleviate whatever impact humanity is having on oceanic life.

== In religion ==
For the most part Islamic dietary laws allow the eating of seafood, though the Hanbali forbid eels, the Shafi forbid frogs and crocodiles, and the Hanafi forbid bottom feeders such as shellfish and carp. The Jewish laws of Kashrut forbid the eating of shellfish and eels. In the Old Testament, the Mosaic covenant allowed the Israelites to eat Finfish, but shellfish and eels were an abomination and not allowed.

Pescatarianism was widespread in the early Christian Church, among both the clergy and laity. In ancient and medieval times, the Catholic Church forbade the practice of eating meat, eggs and dairy products during Lent. Thomas Aquinas argued that these "afford greater pleasure as food [than fish], and greater nourishment to the human body, so that from their consumption there results in a greater surplus available for seminal matter, which when abundant becomes a great incentive to lust". In the United States, the Catholic practice of abstaining from meat on Fridays during Lent has popularised the Friday fish fry. In predominantly Roman Catholic areas, restaurants may adjust their menus during Lent by adding seafood items to the menu.

== See also ==
- Cold chain
- Fish as food
- Fish processing
- Fish market
- Friend of the Sea
- Got Mercury?
- Jellyfish as food
- List of fish dishes
- List of foods
- List of harvested aquatic animals by weight
- List of seafood companies
- List of seafood dishes
- List of seafood restaurants
- Oyster bar
- Raw bar
- Safe Harbor Certified Seafood
- Seafood Watch, sustainable consumer guide (USA)
