= Aquaculture of catfish =

Farming of catfish for food

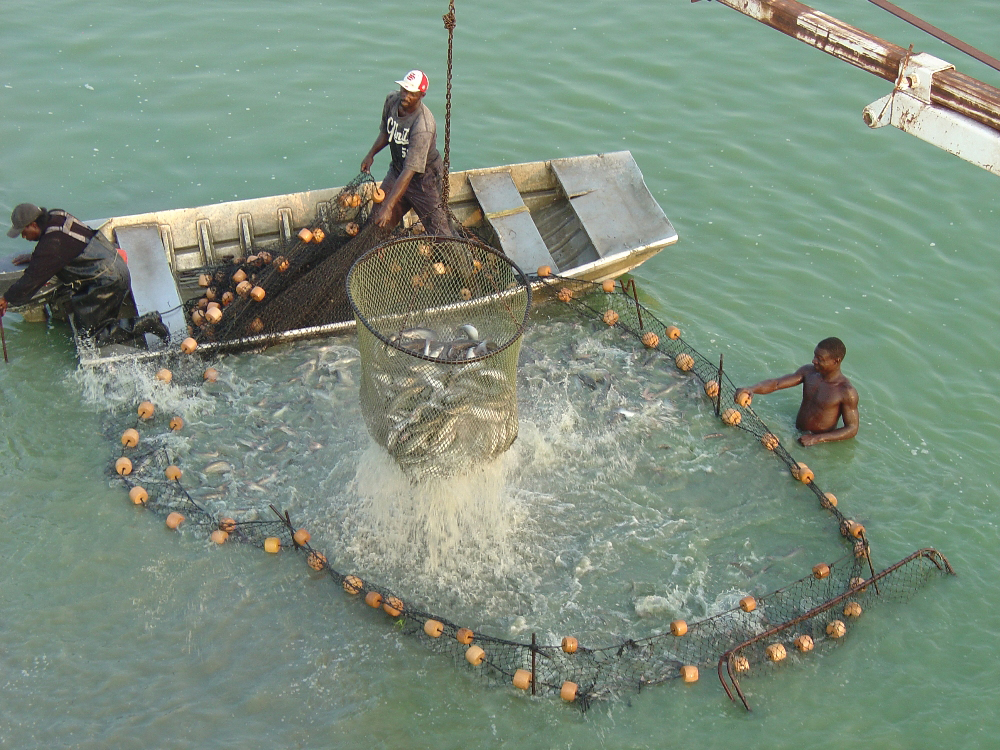
Loading U.S. farm-raised catfish

Catfish are easy to farm in warm climates, leading to inexpensive and safe food at local grocers. Catfish raised in inland tanks or channels are considered safe for the environment, since their waste and disease should be contained and not spread to the wild.

== Asia ==
In Asia, many catfish species are important as food. Several airbreathing catfish (Claridae) and shark catfish (Pangasiidae) species are heavily cultured in Africa and Asia. Exports of one particular shark catfish species from Vietnam, Pangasius bocourti, has met with pressures from the U.S. catfish industry. In 2003, the United States Congress passed a law preventing the imported fish from being labeled as catfish. As a result, the Vietnamese exporters of this fish now label their products sold in the U.S. as "basa fish".

== United States ==
Ictalurids are cultivated in North America, especially in the Deep South, with Mississippi being the largest domestic catfish producer. Channel catfish (Ictalurus punctatus) supported a $450 million/yr aquaculture industry in 2003. In 2023, the U.S. produced 322 million pounds of catfish.

The US farm-raised catfish industry began in the early 1960s in Kansas, Oklahoma and Arkansas. Channel catfish quickly became the major catfish grown, as it was hardy and easily spawned in earthen ponds. By the late 1960s, the industry moved into the Mississippi Delta as farmers struggled with sagging profits in cotton, rice and soybeans, especially on those farm areas where soils had a very high clay content.

The Mississippi Delta became the industry home for the catfish industry, as they had the soils, climate and shallow aquifers to provide water for the earthen ponds that grow 360 to 380 million pounds (160,000–170,000 metric tons) of catfish annually. Catfish are fed a grain-based diet that includes soybean meal. Fish are fed daily through the summer, at rates of 1–6% of body weight with pelleted floating feed. Catfish need about two pounds of feed to produce one pound of live weight. Mississippi is home to 100,000 acres (400 km^{2}) of catfish ponds, the largest of any state. Other states important in growing catfish include Alabama, Arkansas and Louisiana.

== Aquarium ==
There is a large and growing ornamental fish trade, with hundreds of species of catfish, such as Corydoras and armored suckermouth catfish (often called plecos), being a popular component of many aquaria. Other catfish commonly found in the aquarium trade are banjo catfish, talking catfish, and long-whiskered catfish.

== See also ==
- John Halver
- List of harvested aquatic animals by weight
