= BioTork =

Biotechnology company

- Company type: Private
- Industry: Renewable Chemicals
- Founded: 2008
- Headquarters: Florida
- Website: www.biotork.com

BioTork is a biotechnology company founded in 2008 that specializes in the optimization of industrial fermentation processes. BioTork provides robust microorganisms that are able to convert low-value, raw carbon sources such as agroindustrial by-products and waste into high-value chemical commodities (e.g. biofuel and feed). These biochemical commodities such as omega-3 oil, lipids, fuels, enzymes, plastics and other compounds are derived from renewable feedstock using a continuous culture technology.

== Technology ==
BioTork has an exclusive license with Evolugate, a technology provider specializing in adaptive evolution technology that is a continuous culture apparatus which selects the fittest genetic variants from a certain population under controlled environmental conditions. After multiple stages of natural selection, the microorganisms acquire enhanced capabilities that were not present in the original strain. These new capabilities include a faster growth rate, the ability to grow at non-optimal temperatures, resistance to inhibitors or growth under nutrient limiting conditions

=== Non-GMO ===
The microorganisms that are evolved with Evolugate's technology are done so through natural selection, and therefore are enhanced without genetically modifying their composition. This allows for the microorganism to exist without being labelled as a GMO, and therefore circumvents issues related to food and feed regulations.

=== Versatile Feedstock ===
The technology that BioTork uses through Evolugate is able to convert unrefined, raw feedstock into several high quality resources, as mentioned before including omega-3 fatty acids and renewable chemicals. Raw carbon sources are generally renewable, often coming from biodiesel production or leftover agricultural waste. Therefore, the end-product that BioTork is left with is sustainable and inexpensive, in addition to non-GMO.

== Hawaii Zero Waste Program ==
BioTork is currently in collaboration with the US Department of Agriculture and Pacific Basin Agricultural Research Center (USDA-PBARC). This collaboration is related to recent legislation passed in Hawaii to promote upcycling of raw materials, or agricultural waste, as part of the Zero Waste initiative. The State of Hawaii has dedicated special purpose revenue bonds of up to $50,000,000 that will be used towards upcycling the unmarketable papayas from the state and convert them into omega-3 fatty acids that can then be refined into commercial fish feed.

== Collaboration with BASF ==
BASF, The Chemical Company, and BioTork currently have a bioplastics development deal to industrially produce biopolymers and green-based chemicals. The main objective of this collaboration is to improve biochemical production processes through strain development. The financial details of this collaboration and partnership have not been disclosed at this time.
