= Culture of microalgae in hatcheries =

Microscopic algae for food or animal feed

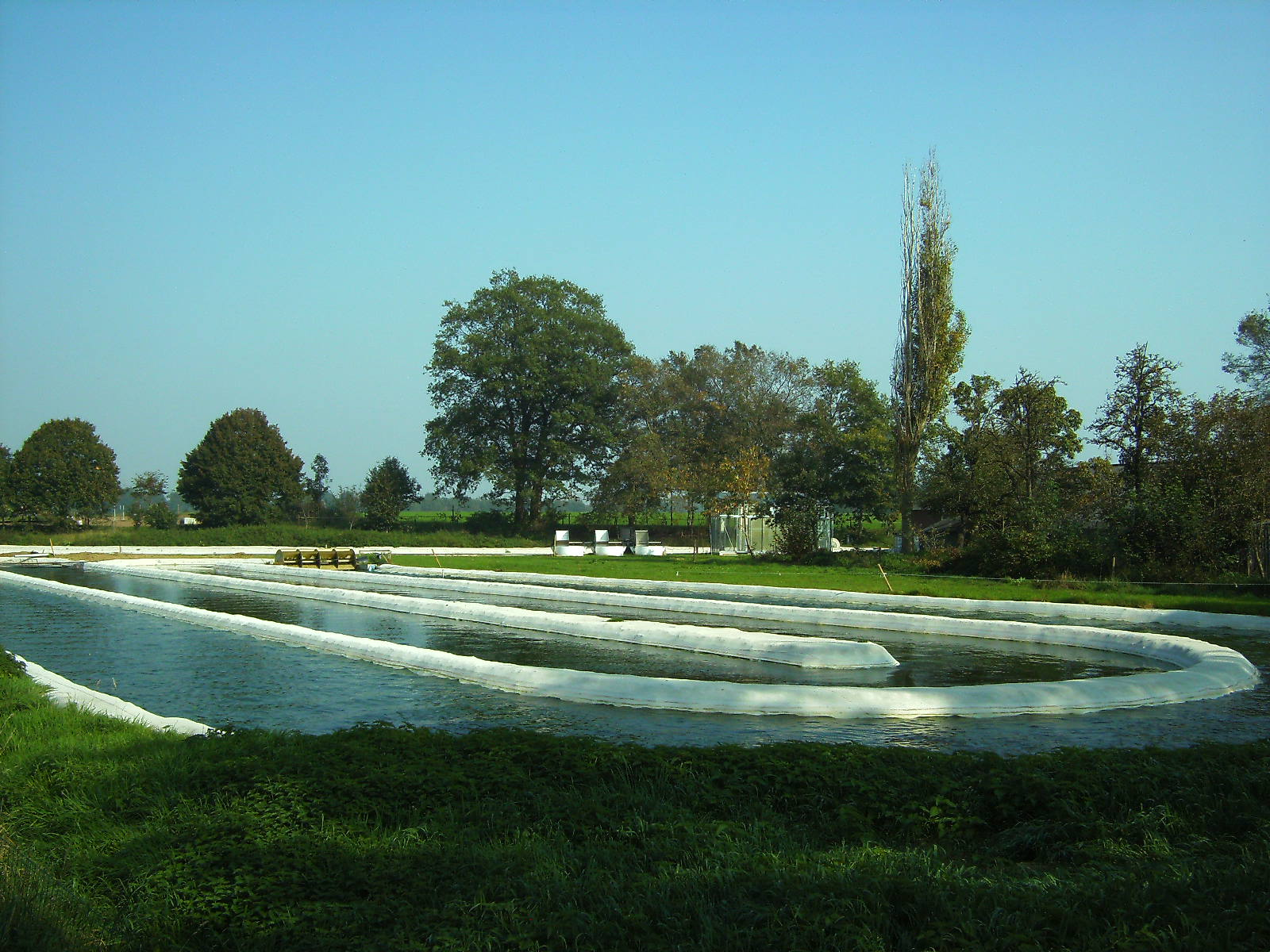
Raceway pond used to cultivate microalgae. The water is kept in constant motion with a powered paddle wheel.

Microalgae or microscopic algae grow in either marine or freshwater systems. They are primary producers in the oceans that convert water and carbon dioxide to biomass and oxygen in the presence of sunlight.

The oldest documented use of microalgae was 2000 years ago, when the Chinese used the cyanobacteria Nostoc as a food source during a famine. Another type of microalgae, the cyanobacteria Arthrospira (Spirulina), was a common food source among populations in Chad and Aztecs in Mexico as far back as the 16th century.

Today cultured microalgae is used as direct feed for humans and land-based farm animals, and as feed for cultured aquatic species such as molluscs and the early larval stages of fish and crustaceans. It is a potential candidate for biofuel production. Microalgae can grow 20 or 30 times faster than traditional food crops, and has no need to compete for arable land. Since microalgal production is central to so many commercial applications, there is a need for production techniques which increase productivity and are economically profitable.

== Commonly cultivated microalgae species ==
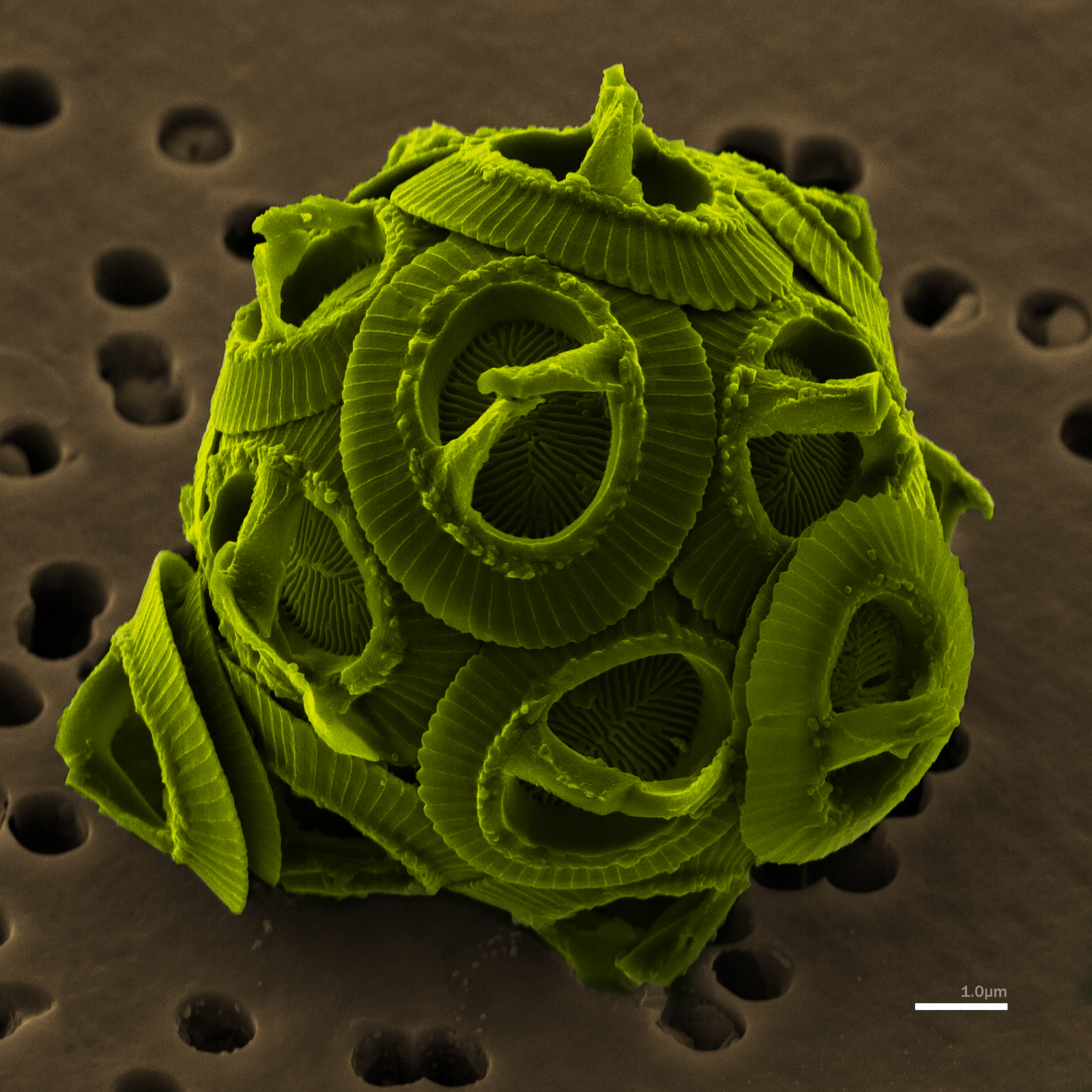
Microalgae are microscopic forms of algae, like this coccolithophore which are between 5 and 100 micrometres across

Species	Application
Chaetoceros sp.	Aquaculture
Chlorella vulgaris	Source of natural antioxidants,high protein content
Dunaliella salina	Produce carotenoids (β-carotene)
Haematococcus sp.	Produce carotenoids (β-carotene), astaxanthin, canthaxanthin
Phaeodactylum tricornutum	Source of antioxidants
Porphyridium cruentum	Source of antioxidants
Rhodella sp.	Colourant for cosmetics
Skeletonema sp	Aquaculture
Arthrospira maxima	High protein content – Nutritional supplement
Arthrospira platensis	High protein content – Nutritional supplement

== Hatchery production techniques ==
A range of microalgae species are produced in hatcheries and are used in a variety of ways for commercial purposes. Studies have estimated main factors in the success of a microalgae hatchery system as the dimensions of the container/bioreactor where microalgae is cultured, exposure to light/irradiation and concentration of cells within the reactor.

=== Open pond system ===
This method has been employed since the 1950s across the CONUS. There are two main advantages of culturing microalgae using the open pond system. Firstly, an open pond system is easier to build and operate. Secondly, open ponds are cheaper than closed bioreactors because closed bioreactors require a cooling system. However, a downside to using open pond systems is decreased productivity of certain commercially important strains such as Arthrospira sp., where optimal growth is limited by temperature. That said, it is possible to use waste heat and CO_{2} from industrial sources to compensate this.

=== Air-lift method ===
This method is used in outdoor cultivation and production of microalgae; where air is moved within a system in order to circulate water where microalgae is growing. The culture is grown in transparent tubes that lie horizontally on the ground and are connected by a network of pipes. Air is passed through the tube such that air escapes from the end that rests inside the reactor that contains the culture and creates an effect like stirring.

=== Closed reactors ===
The biggest advantage of culturing microalgae within a closed system provides control over the physical, chemical and biological environment of the culture. This means factors that are difficult to control in open pond systems such as evaporation, temperature gradients and protection from ambient contamination make closed reactors favoured over open systems. Photobioreactors are the primary example of a closed system where abiotic factors can be controlled for. Several closed systems have been tested to date for the purposes of culturing microalgae, few important ones are mentioned below:

==== Horizontal photobioreactors ====
This system includes tubes laid on the ground to form a network of loops. Mixing of microalgal suspended culture occurs through a pump that raises the culture vertically at timed intervals into a photobioreactor. Studies have found pulsed mixing at intervals produces better results than the use of continuous mixing. Photobioreactors have also been associated with better production than open pond systems as they can maintain better temperature gradients. An example noted in higher production of Arthrospira sp. used as a dietary supplement was attributed to higher productivity because of a better suited temperature range and an extended cultivation period over summer months.

==== Vertical systems ====
These reactors use vertical polyethylene sleeves hung from an iron frame. Glass tubes can also be used alternatively. Microalgae are also cultured in vertical alveolar panels (VAP) that are a type of photobioreactor. This photobioreactor is characterised by low productivity. However, this problem can be overcome by modifying the surface area to volume ratio; where a higher ratio can increase productivity. Mixing and deoxygenation are drawbacks of this system and can be addressed by bubbling air continuously at a mean flow rate. The two main types of vertical photobioreactors are the Flow-through VAP and the Bubble Column VAP.

==== In darkness ====
By using an electrocatalytic process to produce acetate from water, electricity and carbon dioxide, which is then used by the algae as food source, sunlight and photosynthesis is no longer required. The method is still at an early stage, but experiments with algae like Chlamydomonas reinhardtii have turned out to be promising.

=== Flat plate reactors ===
Flat plate reactors(FPR) are built using narrow panels and are placed horizontally to maximise sunlight input to the system. The concept behind FPR is to increase the surface area to volume ratio such that sunlight is efficiently used. This system of microalgae culture was originally thought to be expensive and incapable of circulating the culture. Therefore, FPRs were considered to be unfeasible overall for the commercial production of microalgae. However, an experimental FPR system in the 1980s used circulation within the culture from a gas exchange unit across horizontal panels. This overcomes issues of circulation and provides an advantage of an open gas transfer unit that reduces oxygen build up. Examples of successful use of FPRs can be seen in the production of Nannochloropsis sp. used for its high levels of astaxanthin.

=== Fermentor-type reactors ===
Fermentor-type reactors (FTR) are bioreactors where fermentation is carried out. FTRs have not developed hugely in the cultivation of microalgae and pose a disadvantage in the surface area to volume ratio and a decreased efficiency in utilizing sunlight. FTR have been developed using a combination of sun and artificial light have led to lowering production costs. However, information available on large scale counterparts to the laboratory-scale systems being developed is very limited. The main advantage is that extrinsic factors i.e. light can be controlled for and productivity can be enhanced so that FTR can become an alternative for products for the pharmaceutical industry.

== Commercial applications ==
=== Use in aquaculture ===
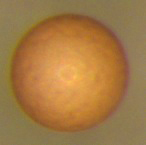
Microalgae is used to culture brine shrimp, which produce dormant eggs (pictured). The eggs can then be hatched on demand and feed to cultured fish larvae and crustaceans.

Microalgae is an important source of nutrition and is used widely in the aquaculture of other organisms, either directly or as an added source of basic nutrients. Aquaculture farms rearing larvae of molluscs, echinoderms, crustaceans and fish use microalgae as a source of nutrition. Low bacteria and high microalgal biomass is a crucial food source for shellfish aquaculture.

Microalgae can form the start of a chain of further aquaculture processes. For example, microalgae is an important food source in the aquaculture of brine shrimp. Brine shrimp produce dormant eggs, called cysts, which can be stored for long periods and then hatched on demand to provide a convenient form of live feed for the aquaculture of larval fish and crustaceans.

Other applications of microalgae within aquaculture include increasing the aesthetic appeal of finfish bred in captivity. One such example can be noted in the aquaculture of salmon, where microalgae is used to make salmon flesh pinker. This is achieved by the addition of natural pigments containing carotenoids such as astaxanthin produced from the microalgae Haematococcus to the diet of farmed animals. Two microalgae species, I. galbana and C. calcitrans are mostly composed of proteins, which are used to brighten the color of salmon and related species.

=== Human nutrition ===
The main species of microalgae grown as health foods are Chlorella and Spirulina (Arthrospira platensis). The main forms of production occur in small scale ponds with artificial mixers. Arthrospira platensis is a blue-green microalga with a long history as a food source in East Africa and pre-colonial Mexico. Spirulina is high in protein and other nutrients, finding use as a food supplement and for malnutrition. It thrives in open systems and commercial growers have found it well-suited to cultivation. One of the largest production sites is Lake Texcoco in central Mexico. The plants produce a variety of nutrients and high amounts of protein, and is often used commercially as a nutritional supplement. Chlorella has similar nutrition to spirulina, and is very popular in Japan. It is also used as a nutritional supplement, with possible effects on metabolic rate.

Production of long chain omega-3 fatty acids important for human diet can also be cultured through microalgal hatchery systems.

Australian scientists at Flinders University in Adelaide have been experimenting with using marine microalgae to produce proteins for human consumption, creating products like "caviar", vegan burgers, fake meat, jams and other food spreads. By manipulating microalgae in a laboratory, the protein and other nutrient contents could be increased, and flavours changed to make them more palatable. These foods leave a much lighter carbon footprint than other forms of protein, as the microalgae absorb rather than produce carbon dioxide, which contributes to the greenhouse gases.

=== Biofuel production ===
In order to meet the demands of fossil fuels, alternative means of fuels are being investigated. Biodiesel and bioethanol are renewable biofuels with much potential that are important in current research. However, agriculture-based renewable fuels may not be completely sustainable and thus unlikely to completely replace fossil fuels. Microalgae can be remarkably rich in oils (up to 80% dry weight of biomass) suitable for conversion to fuel, and are more productive than land-based agricultural crops, and could therefore be more sustainable in the long run. As of 2008, microalgae for biofuel production was mainly being produced using tubular photobioreactors.

One barrier to the use of microalgae as fuel has been the energy required for pre-treatments necessary to break down complex biopolymers in the cells of microalgae, in order to produce gaseous biofuels such as methane and hydrogen. A 2016 study looked at using biological methods to effect this pretreatment, using purified enzymes to bring about cell degradation.

Botryococcus braunii is one microalgae that has been studied as a potential source of biofuel, in particular through its naturally occurring residue known as coorongite, which is found in Australia. Researchers at the Western Sydney University looked at using pyrolysis to remove carboxyl before further processing using hydrocracking and hydrogenation.

=== Pharmaceuticals and cosmetics ===
Novel bioactive chemical compounds can be isolated from microalgae like sulphated polysaccharides. These compounds include fucoidans, carrageenans and ulvans that are used for their beneficial properties. These properties are anticoagulants, antioxidants, anticancer agents that are being tested medical research.

Red microalgae are characterised by pigments called phycobiliproteins that contain natural colourants used in pharmaceuticals and/or cosmetics.

=== Biofertilizer ===
Blue green alga was first used as a means of fixing nitrogen by allowing cyanobacteria to multiply in the soil, acting as a biofertilizer. Nitrogen fixation is important as a means of allowing inorganic compounds such as nitrogen to be converted to organic forms which can then be used by plants. The use of cyanobacteria is an economically sound and environmentally friendly method of increasing productivity. This method has been use for rice production in India and Iran, using the nitrogen fixing properties of free living cyanobacteria to supplement nitrogen content in soils.

=== Other uses ===
Microalgae are a source of valuable molecules such as isotopes i.e. chemical variants of an element that contain different neutrons. Microalgae can effectively incorporate isotopes of carbon (^{13}C), nitrogen (^{15}N) and hydrogen (^{2}H) into their biomass. ^{13}C and ^{15}N are used to track the flow of carbon between different trophic levels/food webs. Carbon, nitrogen and sulphur isotopes can also be used to determine disturbances to bottom dwelling communities that are otherwise difficult to study.

== Issues ==
Cell fragility is the biggest issue that limits the productivity from closed photobioreactors. Damage to cells can be attributed to the turbulent flow within the bioreactor which is required to create mixing so light is available to all cells.

== See also ==
- Algae fuel
- Microbiofuels
