= Shrimp mix =

Shrimp mix, also known as European shrimp mix, is a frozen fish feed used for fish with special dietary requirements, e.g. Tropheus, which are difficult to maintain using normal fish feed. The basic version is intended for herbivorous fish and is made by blending equal amounts of whole shrimp and green peas to a smooth paste, adding a vitamin supplement, and using either agar-agar or gelatin as binder. There are numerous variants tailored to the specific needs of different species. Common variants replace part of the shrimp or peas with fish meat, spinach, spirulina, or mussel meat, goat heart, and add astaxanthin, ascorbic acid, or garlic.

== See also ==
- Aquarium fish feed
- Commercial fish feed
