= Commercial fish feed =

Fish food manufactured commercially

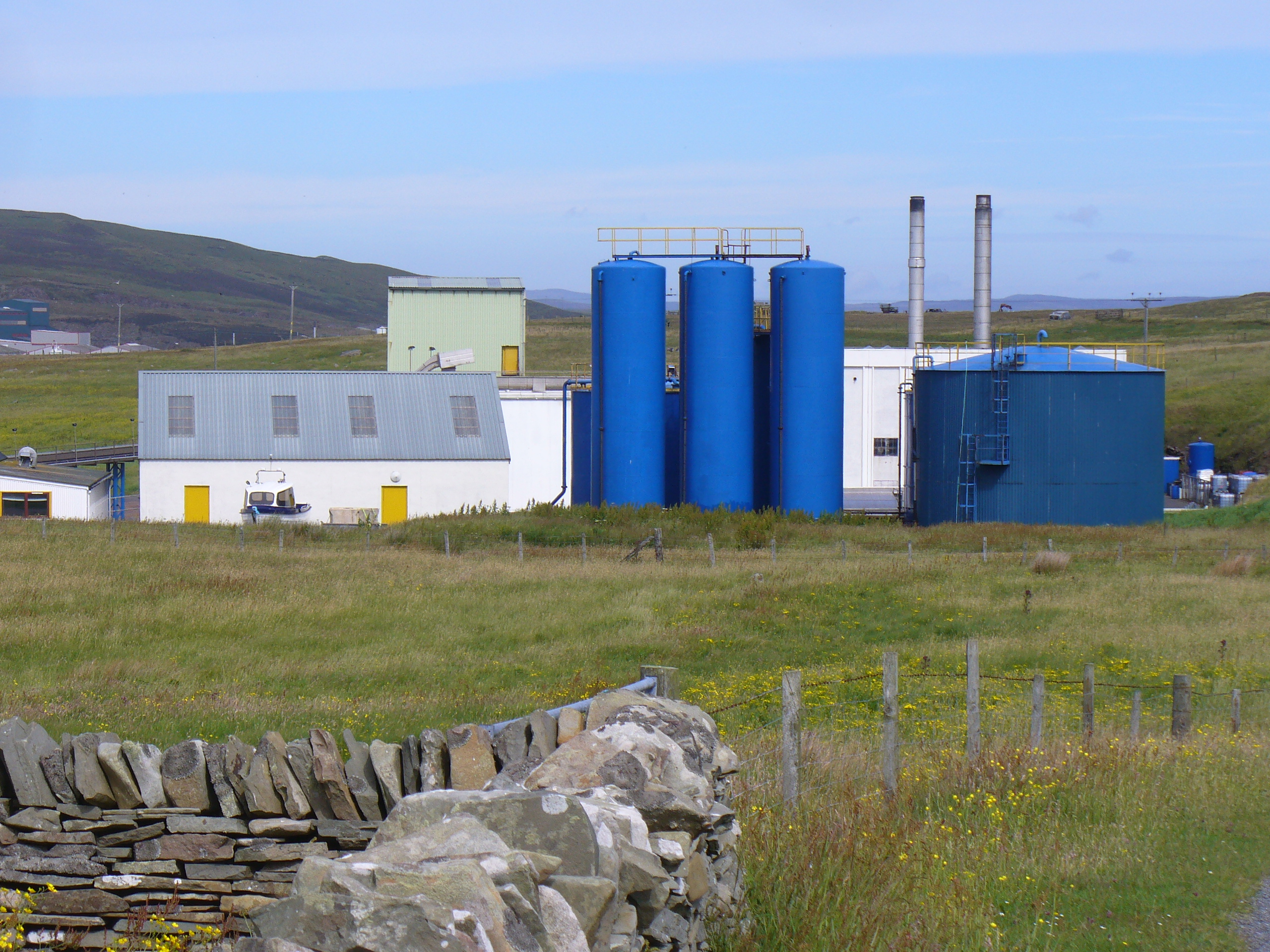
Fish meal factory, Bressay

A betta fish eating commercial fish food.

Manufactured feeds are an important part of modern commercial aquaculture. They provide the balanced nutrition needed by farmed fish. The feeds, in the form of granules or pellets, give nutrition in a stable and concentrated form, enabling the fish to feed efficiently and grow to their full potential.

Many of the fish farmed more intensively around the world today are carnivorous, such as Atlantic salmon, trout, sea bass, and turbot. Starting in the 1970s, fishmeal and fish oil were key components of the feeds for these species in the development of modern aquaculture. They are combined with other ingredients such as vegetable proteins, cereal grains, vitamins and minerals and formed into feed pellets. Wheat, for example, is widely used as it helps to bind the ingredients in the pellets.

Other forms of fish feed being used include feeds made entirely with vegetable materials for species such as carp, moist feeds preferred by some species (easier to make but more difficult to store), and trash fish —that is, fish caught and fed directly to larger species being raised in aquaculture pens.

== Hatchery feeds ==
Specialised feeds are produced for fish hatcheries. In species such as salmon and trout, the newly hatched fry first feed from their yolk sacs and then can be fed with starter feeds. Marine species such as sea bass, sea bream, flounders and turbot consume the nutrition in their yolk sacs during the first few days post hatching and then are fed for several weeks on live prey, in the form of rotifers and brine shrimp (Artemia).

== Development of manufactured feeds ==
Until the end of World War II most fish hatcheries relied on raw meat (horse meat in particular) as a dietary staple for trout. In the early 1950s, John E. (Red) Hanson, while working for the New Mexico Game and Fish Department, began experimenting with dietary routine and dry pellet formulations. The first fish feed pellets were introduced to hatchery trout at the Red River Hatchery near Taos. The pellets resulted in improved conversion rates of food intake to fish production, and led in turn to the wider adoption of fish pellets in hatcheries.

== Sustainability ==
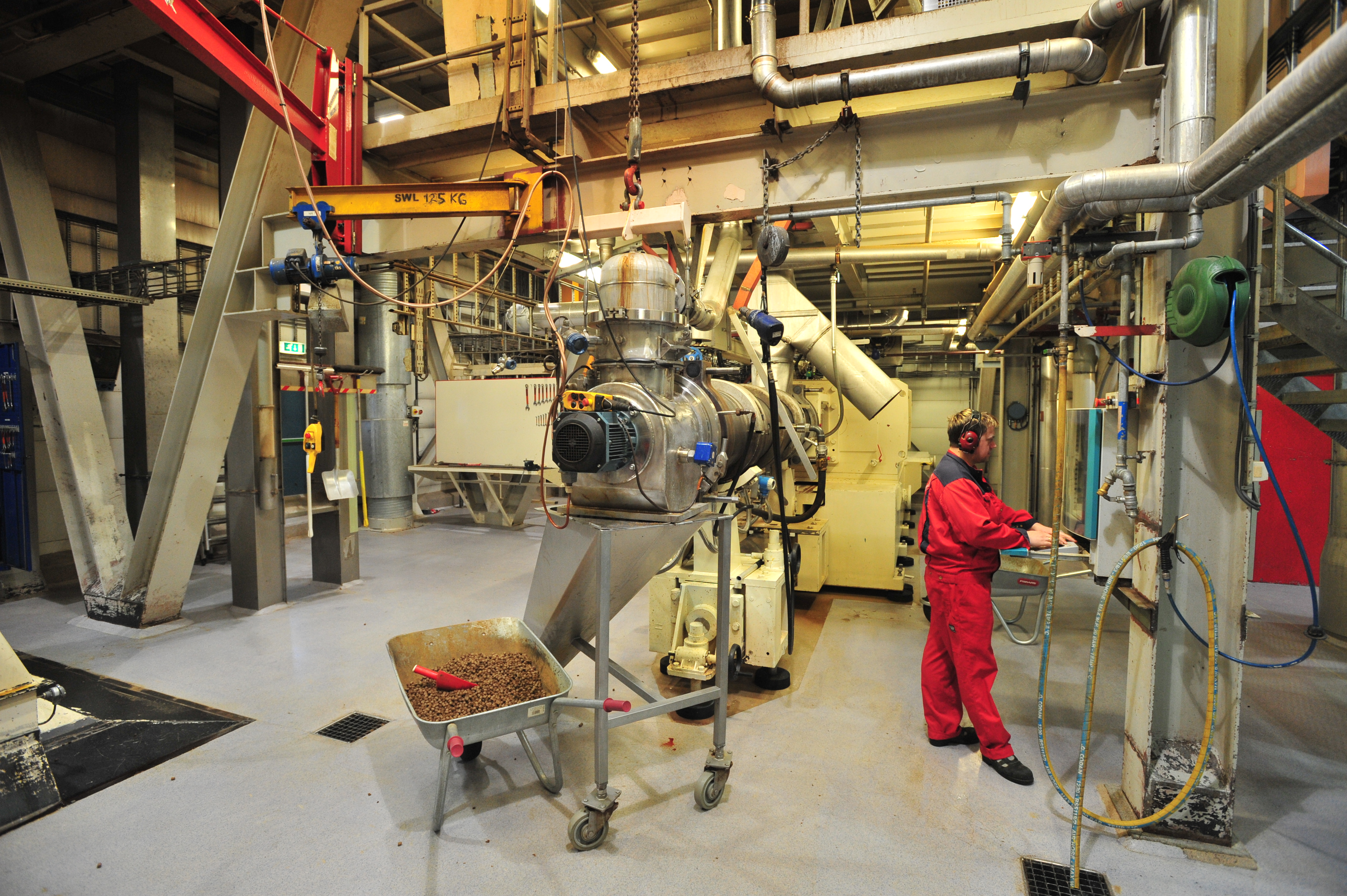
Fish feed production in Stokmarknes Norway

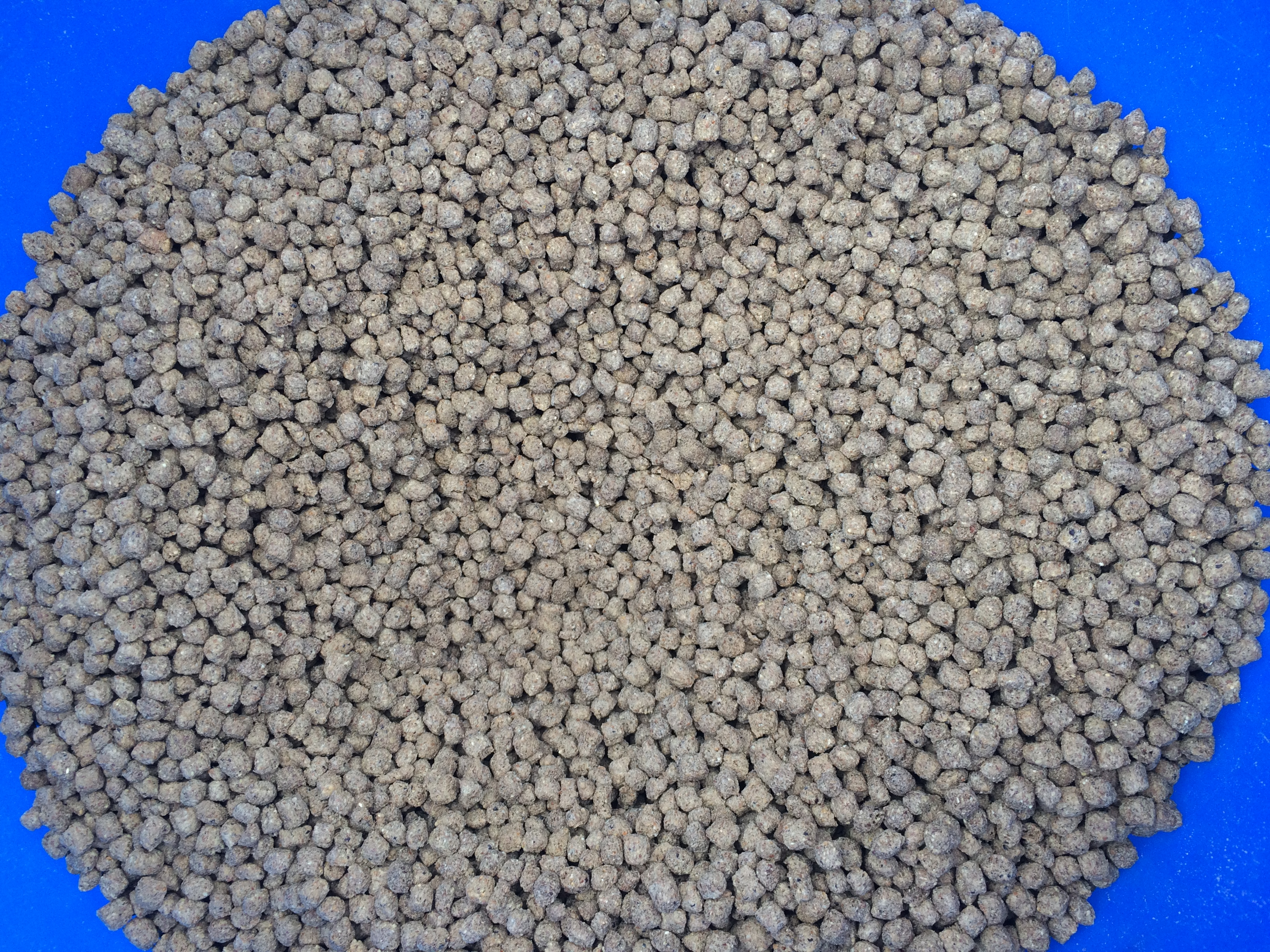
Dry fish feed pellets

Traditionally two of the most important ingredients have been fishmeal and fish oil. These come mainly from the processing of fish from the wild catch, usually pelagic species that are generally not suited to processing for human consumption. Fish sold for human consumption attract a higher price than those used to make fishmeal. The fishmeal fisheries are often referred to as reduction fisheries. The world's largest reduction fishery is in the Pacific, off the coast of Peru and Chile and is regulated by the governments of those countries. The North Atlantic is another important source of fish for fishmeal and fish oil. Many major suppliers belong to the International Fishmeal and Fish Oil Organisation.

Fishmeal is a brown, flour-like material made by specialist producers that cook, press, dry and grind the fish. The fish oil is effectively a by-product of this process that proves to be a rich source of energy and fatty acids for fish, including the important long-chain omega-3 fatty acids EPA and DHA now linked to the health benefits associated with eating oily fish such as salmon and mackerel. Fish in general also are good sources of many vitamins and minerals and are often recommended as part of a healthy diet by governmental food agencies.

The current drive in research and development is enabling aquaculture by supplementing fishmeal and fish oil with vegetable proteins and oils. Other potential raw material resources are also being explored. For example, the U.S. biotechnology company BioTork is piloting the use of raw materials such as unmarketable papaya and by-products from biodiesel production to produce fish feed components, as well as feeding agricultural waste to algae and fungi that manufacture some of the proteins and omega-3 oils needed for fish food. The US biotechnology company Calysta and the UK/Danish biotech company Unibio opened small plants in the UK and Denmark to produce fish feed from natural gas in 2016. In 2020 scientists reported the development of a microalgae-based fish-free aquaculture feed with substantial gains in sustainability, performance, economic viability, and human health. The feed consists of protein-rich defatted biomass of Nannochloropsis oculata and whole cells of DHA-rich Schizochytrium sp. and was found to perform better in growth, weight gain, specific growth rate, best feed conversion ratio and fish nutrient content than the reference diet of ocean-derived fishmeal and fish oil.

== Modern fish feed ==
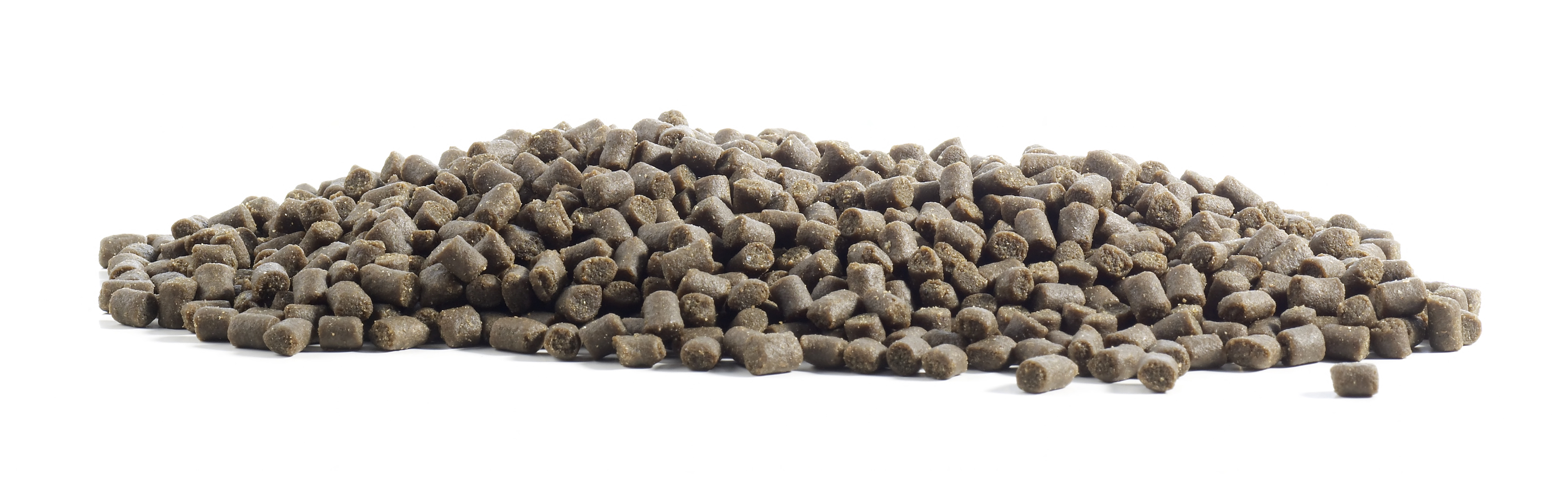
Extruded fish feed

Modern fish feeds are made by grinding and mixing together ingredients such as fishmeal, vegetable proteins and binding agents such as wheat. In the current technology, fish feed extruders play a key role in production lines. Although the majority of the process of the fish feed production occurs in the extruder, grinding and mixing can highly affect the quality of the final product. Water is added and the resulting paste is extruded through holes in a metal plate. The diameter of the holes is usually the most important parameter that sets the diameter of the pellets, which can range from less than a millimetre to over a centimetre. As the feed is extruded it is cut to form pellets of the required length. The pellets are dried and oils are added. Adjusting parameters such as temperature and pressure enables the manufacturers to make pellets that suit different fish farming methods, for example feeds that float or sink slowly and feeds suited to recirculation systems. The dry feed pellets are stable for relatively long periods, for convenient storage and distribution. Feeds are delivered in bulk, in large bags—usually one tonne, or in 25 kilogram bags. Smaller quantities of specialist feeds are supplied for use in fish hatcheries.

== See also ==
- Aquaculture of brine shrimp
- Aquarium fish feed
- John Halver – the father of fish nutrition
- Shrimp mix
- Skretting Aquaculture Research Centre
