= John Halver =

American biochemist

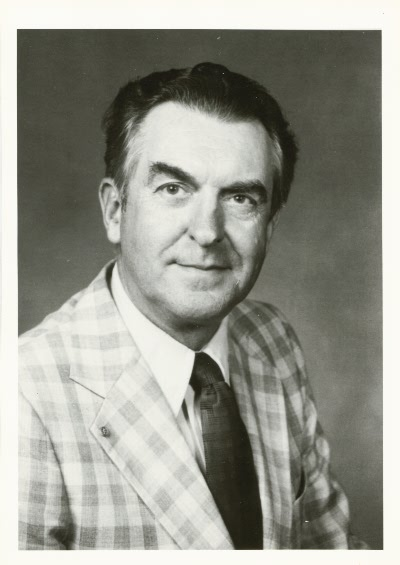
John E. Halver (age 65)

John Emil Halver (April 21, 1922 – October 24, 2012) was an American biochemist known for his research into the nutritional biochemistry, physiology, and cellular biochemistry of fish. His work on the nutritional needs of fish led to modern methods of fish farming and fish feed production around the world. He held a position with the United States Fish and Wildlife Service as director of the Western Fish Nutrition Laboratory in Cook, Washington, where Halver and his staff carried out research on the nutrient requirements for Pacific salmon.

== Early life and education ==
Halver received his bachelor's degree in chemistry and a master's in organic chemistry from Washington State University, completing his thesis, *Enzymatic Resolution of Amino Acid Phenyl Hydrazides" in 1948. His Ph.D. is in medical biochemistry, and was awarded by the University of Washington Medical School based on his thesis, *A vitamin test diet for chinook salmon: the water-soluble vitamin requirement of chinook salmon" in 1953.

He served as a US Army Ranger, European Theatre during WWII; Platoon Leader to captain, 100th Division, 399 Infantry, Fox Company. Citations received: Croix d’Valeur (France), Purple Heart, Presidential Unit Citation, American Theatre Service Medal, European-African-Middle Eastern Service Medal with two Bronze Stars, World War II Victory Medal, Combat Infantry Badge, Army of Occupation (Germany), and the Citoyen d’Honneur (France). He served in three campaigns: Southern France, The Rhineland, and Southern Germany.

== Career ==
In addition to research, Halver taught at the University of Washington. Some of his students have become directors of federal fisheries programs, feed manufacturing plants, and university aquaculture programs. He was named Senior Scientist in Nutrition in 1975 and was US Science Ambassador 1975–1992.

In 2005, Halver was named as one of the "Leading Scientists of the World" by the International Biographical Centre of Cambridge, England., because of his work for the Food and Agricultural Organization of the United Nations, the United Nations Development Program, the World Bank, the United States Agency for International Development, and the International Executive Service Corps, which led to improved food supply for populations in developing countries.

== Research ==
Halver discovered the cause of trout hepatomas (liver cancer) in the early 1960s, and developed methods of avoiding them. He was voted into the National Academy of Sciences in 1978 on the basis of that work.

== Selected publications ==
- Fish Feed Technology. J. E. Halver, Ed. 395 Pgs. ADCP/REP/80/11. FAO; Rome, Italy. 1980
- Metabolism of Ascorbic Acid and Ascorbic-2-sulfate in Man and the subhuman primate. E. M. Baker, J. E. Halver, D.O.Johnsen, B.E.Joyce, M.K.Knight, and B. M. Tolbert. Annuals of the New York Academy of Sciences. 258: 72-80 1975
- Aflatoxicosis and Trout Hepatoma. John E Halver pp265–306 in Aflatoxin, L.A. Goldblatt, ed. Academic Press, NY
- Special Methods in Pond Fish Husbandry. L. Horvath, G. Tamas, and I. Tolg. (J. E. Halver, Ed.) Akademiai Kaido; Budapest, Hungary. 150 pgs. 1985
- Investigation on nutrition of some cultivable finfish species and development of cost-effective formulae feeds. A.K. Jafree and J.E. Halver. ICAR-USDA IN-AES-251. pgs 93. 1991
- Nutrient requirements and metabolism of marine species. in Halver, J.E. (C. S. Lee, editor). Aquaculture: Retrospective and Outlook. - An Aquaculture Summit. Asian Fisheries Society, Manila, Philippines and World Aquaculture Society, Baton Rouge, Louisiana, USA. P.117-132
- Separation of three commercial forms of Vitamin C (L-ascorbic acid, Ascorbic-2-sulfate, and Ascorbic-2-polyphosphate) by HPLC. S. Felton and J. E. Halver. Proceedings of the Society for Experimental Biology & Medicine. 190: 217–218. (1989)
- L-Ascorbyl-2-Sulfate alleviates Atlantic Salmon scurvy. J. E. Halver and R. W. Hardy. Proceedings of the Society for Experimental Biology & Medicine 206: 421–424. 1994
- Efficacy of L-ascorbyl-2-sulfate as a Vitamin C source for Rainbow Trout. Proceedings of the IV International Symposium on Fish Nutrition and Feeding held June 1991 in Biarritz, France. J. E. Halver, S. Felton, A. Palmisano. p 137–147 in Fish Nutrition in Practice ( S. J. Kaushik and P Luquet, Eds.) INRA; Paris, France. 1992
- Effects of dietary Omega-3 polyunsaturated fatty acids on brain gene expression. Kitajka, Klara; Sinclair, Andrew J; Weisinger, Richard S; Weisinger, Harrison S; Mathai, Michael; Jayasooriya, Anura P; Halver, JE; Puskas, Laszlo G. Proc. Natl. Acad. Sci. USA 101:10931-10936 (2004)
- A vitamin test diet for long-term feeding studies. J. E. Halver and J. A. Coates. Progressive Fish-Culturist. 19: 112–118. 1957
- Nutrition of Salmonoid Fishes, IV. An amino acid test diet for Chinook Salmon. J. E. Halver. Journal of Nutrition. 62: 245–254. 1957

== Personal life ==
Halver was an active Christian, and gave lectures on the harmony between science and theology, At the time of his death Halver was married to Jane Loren Halver (his wife of 68 years) and had 5 children: John Emil IV, Nancylee, Janet, Peter, and Deborah, 12 grandchildren, and 4 great-grandchildren.
