= Aquaculture of brine shrimp =

Farming of a type of crustacean

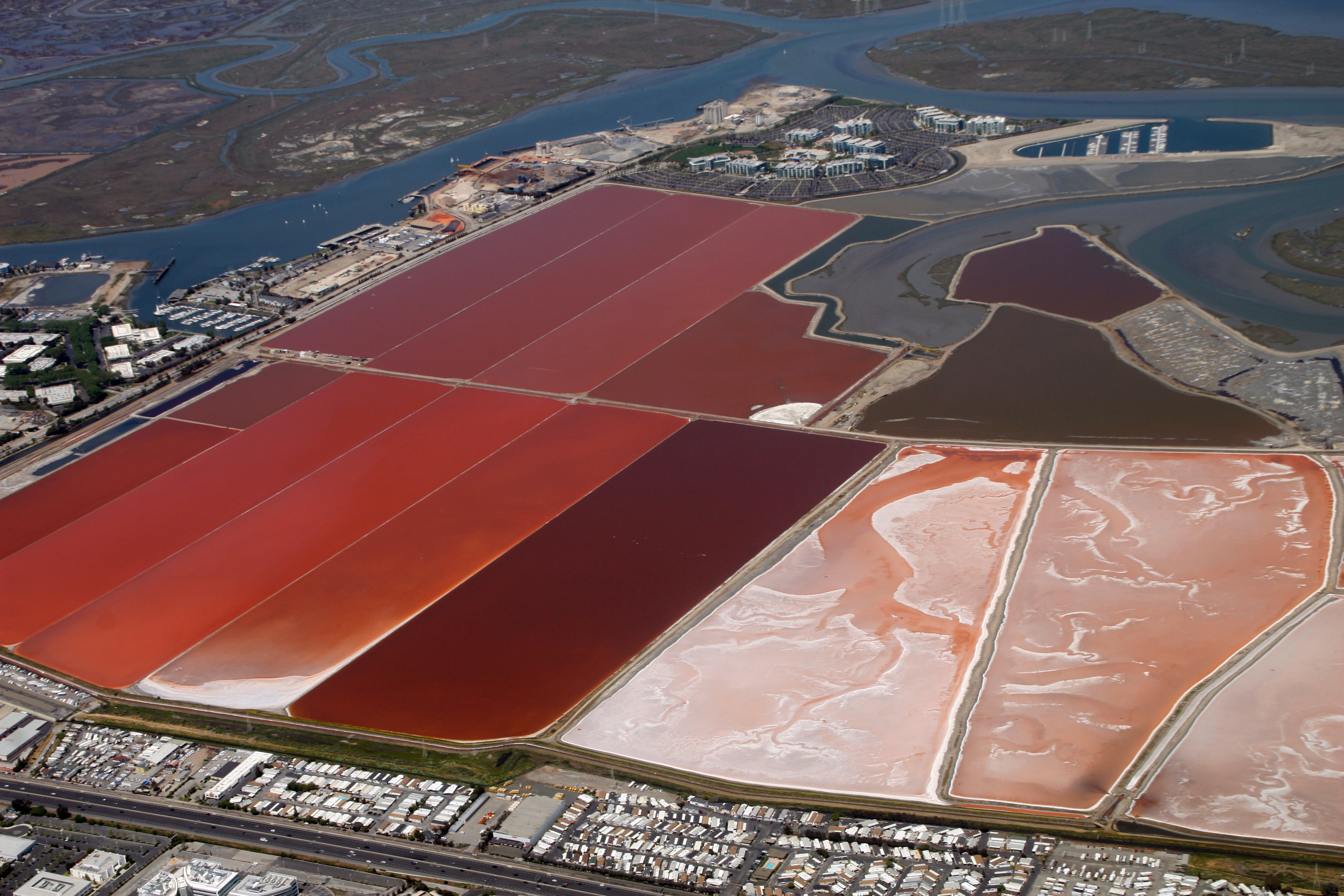
San Francisco Bay Salt Ponds

Brine shrimp have the ability to produce dormant eggs, known as cysts. This has led to the extensive use of brine shrimp in aquaculture. The cysts may be stored for long periods and hatched on demand to provide a convenient form of live feed for larval fish and crustaceans.

From cysts, brine shrimp nauplii can readily be used to feed to fish and crustacean larvae just after one-day incubation. Instar I (the nauplii that just hatched and with large yolk reserves in their body) and instar II nauplii (the nauplii after first moult and with functional digestive tracts) are more widely used in aquaculture, for the reasons they are easy for operation, nutrients rich, and of small size which makes them suitable for feeding fish and crustacean larvae live or after drying.

== Diet ==
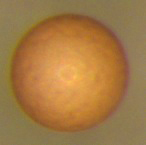
Brine shrimp cyst

In their first stage of development, brine shrimp nauplii do not feed but consume their own energy reserves stored in the cyst. Wild brine shrimp eat microscopic planktonic algae. Cultured brine shrimp can also be fed particulate foods including yeast, wheat flour, soybean powder or egg yolk.

== Reproduction ==
Adult female brine shrimp ovulate approximately every 140 hours. In favourable conditions, the female brine shrimp can produce eggs that almost immediately hatch. While in extreme conditions, such as low oxygen level or salinity above 150‰, female brine shrimp produce eggs with a chorion coating which has a brown colour. These eggs, also known as cysts, are metabolically inactive and can remain in total stasis for two years while in dry oxygen-free conditions, even at temperatures below freezing. This characteristic is called cryptobiosis, meaning "hidden life". While in cryptobiosis, brine shrimp eggs can survive temperatures of liquid air (−190 °C or −310.0 °F) and a small percentage can survive above boiling temperature (105 °C or 221 °F) for up to two hours. Once placed in briny (salt) water (>5‰), the eggs hatch within a few hours. The nauplii, or larvae, are less than 0.4 mm in length when they first hatch. Brine shrimp have a biological life cycle of 3-4 months

== Nutritional benefits ==
Since no artificial feed formulation is yet available to completely substitute for brine shrimp, feeding live prey to young fish and crustacean larvae still remains essential in commercial hatchery operation. The nutritional properties of newly hatched brine shrimp are high in lipids and unsaturated fatty acids. Dried brine shrimp nauplii contain 37%–71% protein, 12%–30% lipid, 11%–23% carbohydrate, and 4%–21% ash.

The fatty acid compositions of the nauplii are highly environmentally determined. Also the nutritional quality of commercially available brine shrimp strains being relatively poor in eicosapentaenoic acid (EPA, 20:5n-3), and especially docosahexaenoic acid (DHA, 22:6n-3). Since these components are critical for the larvae development, it is common practice to feed this live prey with emulsions of marine oils that are rich in the EPA and DHA, which is referred as enrichment processes.

== Industrial hatchery ==
Since the development of commercial marine fish culture in the late 1970s, the demand for brine shrimp cysts has gradually increased from a few tonnes to approximately 800 tonnes per annum, representing approximately 40% of the total aquaculture demand for feeds for early stages. The price of the cysts varies during the last a few decades depending on both demand and the quality of the cysts. During the last 25 years, the Great Salt Lake in the United States has been the major supplier of brine shrimp cysts to the world aquaculture industry and the subject of numerous speculations regarding its capacity to sustain a growing aquaculture industry. However, due to the unpredictable fluctuation of the cyst yield from Great Salt Lake, there are other sites for cyst production, such as Lake Urmia in Iran, Aibi Lake in China, Bolshoye Yarovoye in Siberia, Kara Bogaz Gol in Turkmenistan, and several lakes in Kazakhstan.

Although hatchery processes of brine shrimp are relative simple and easy to operate, a series of factors need to be controlled and monitored to make optimal use of the cysts. The critical factors are light, temperature, salinity, oxygen level, pH and cyst density, which vary between different brine shrimp strains. Hatching quality can be described by hatching efficiency (number of nauplii per gram of cysts), hatching percentage or hatching synchrony (time between first and last hatching cysts).

There are six stages in the hatching and development of brine shrimp industrial hatchery.

After hatching, and prior to feeding them to the fish or crustacean larvae, brine shrimp nauplii should be separated from the hatching wastes. After switching off the aeration in the hatching tank, cyst shells will float and nauplii will concentrate at the bottom of the tank. The nauplii are further concentrated in a concentrator rinse and separated from the cysts. The enrichment process, if needed, generally occurs after the nauplii develop a digestive tract.
