= Forage fish =

Small prey fish

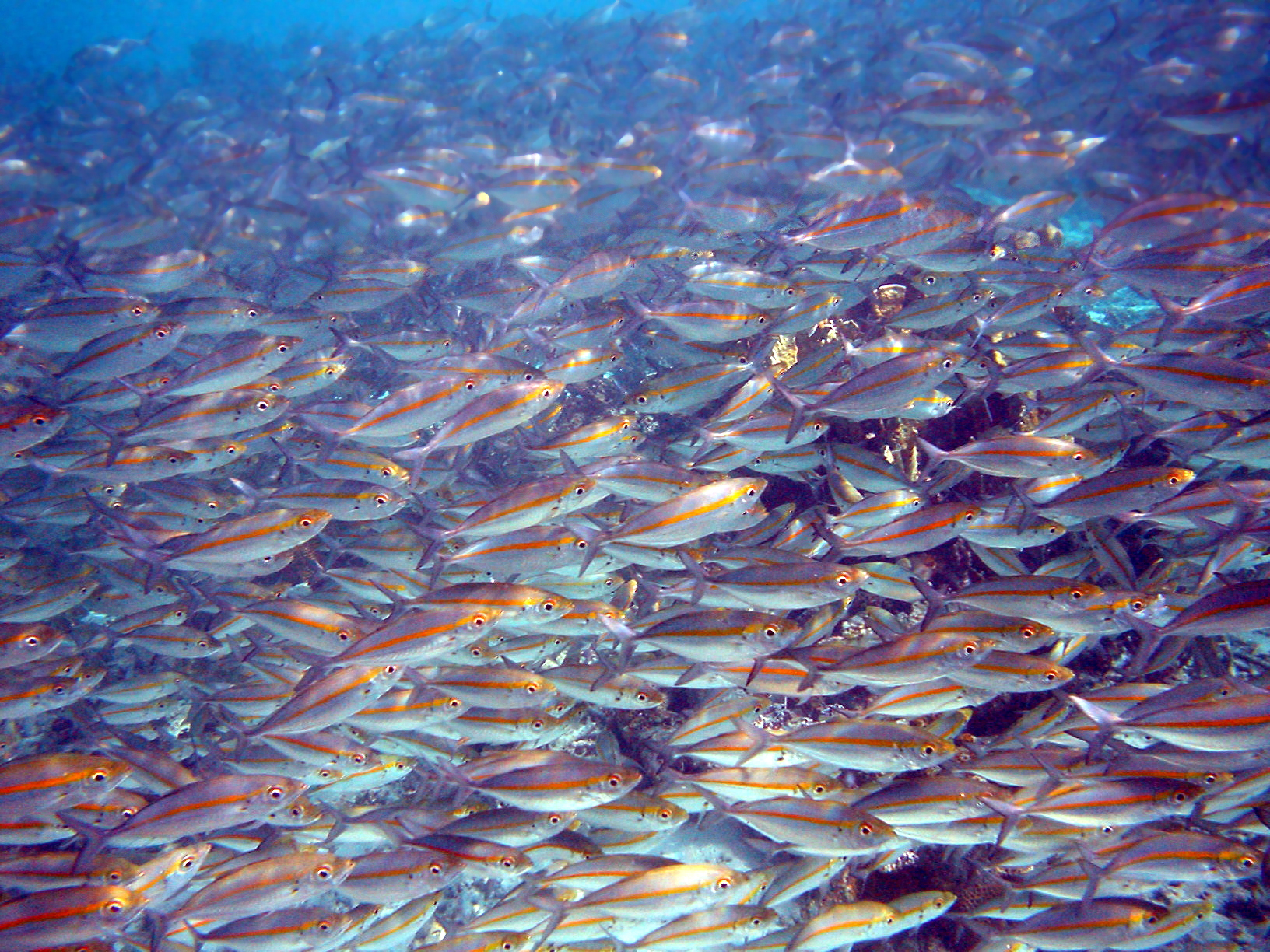
These small goldband fusiliers are typical forage fish. They swim in large schools for protection from larger predators.

Forage fish, also called prey fish or bait fish, are small pelagic fish that feed on plankton (i.e., planktivores) and other small aquatic organisms (e.g., krill). They are in turn preyed upon by various predators including larger fish, seabirds and marine mammals, this making them keystone species in their aquatic ecosystems.

The typical ocean forage fish feed at the lower trophic level of the food chain, often by filter feeding. They include particularly fishes of the order Clupeiformes (herrings, sardines, shad, hilsa, menhaden, anchovies, and sprats), but also other small fish, including halfbeaks, silversides, smelt such as capelin and goldband fusiliers.

Forage fish compensate for their small size by forming schools. Some swim in synchronised grids with their mouths open so they can efficiently filter plankton. These schools can become immense shoals which move along coastlines and migrate across open oceans. The shoals are concentrated energy resources for great marine predators. The predators keenly focus on the shoals, acutely aware of their numbers and whereabouts, and make migrations themselves that can span thousands of miles to pursue them.

The ocean's primary producers, mainly contained in phytoplankton, produce food energy and biomass photosynthetically from sunlight and are the raw fuel for the ocean food webs. Forage fish transfer this energy by eating the plankton and becoming food themselves for the top predators. In this way, forage fish occupy the lower-central positions in ocean and lake food webs.

The fishing industry sometimes catch forage fish for commercial purposes (i.e., as seafood), but primarily for use as feeder fish to raise more valuable piscivorous animals (e.g., salmon farms). Some fisheries scientists are expressing concern that this will affect the populations of predator fish that depend on them. The practice of harvesting forage fish can also be a sign of overfishing as fish stocks of larger species in the fisheries are depleted thus forcing the industry to start fishing down the food web.

== In the oceans ==
Typical ocean forage fish are small, silvery schooling oily fish such as herring, anchovies and menhaden, and other small, schooling baitfish like capelin, smelts, sand lance, halfbeaks, pollock, butterfish and juvenile rockfish. Herrings are a preeminent forage fish, often marketed as sardines or pilchards.

The term "forage fish" is a term used in fisheries, and is applied also to forage species that are not true fish but play a significant role as prey for predators. Thus invertebrates such as squid and shrimp are also referred to as "forage fish". Even the tiny shrimp-like creatures called krill, small enough to be eaten by other forage fish, yet large enough to eat the same zooplankton as forage fish, are often classified as "forage fish".

Ocean forage fish

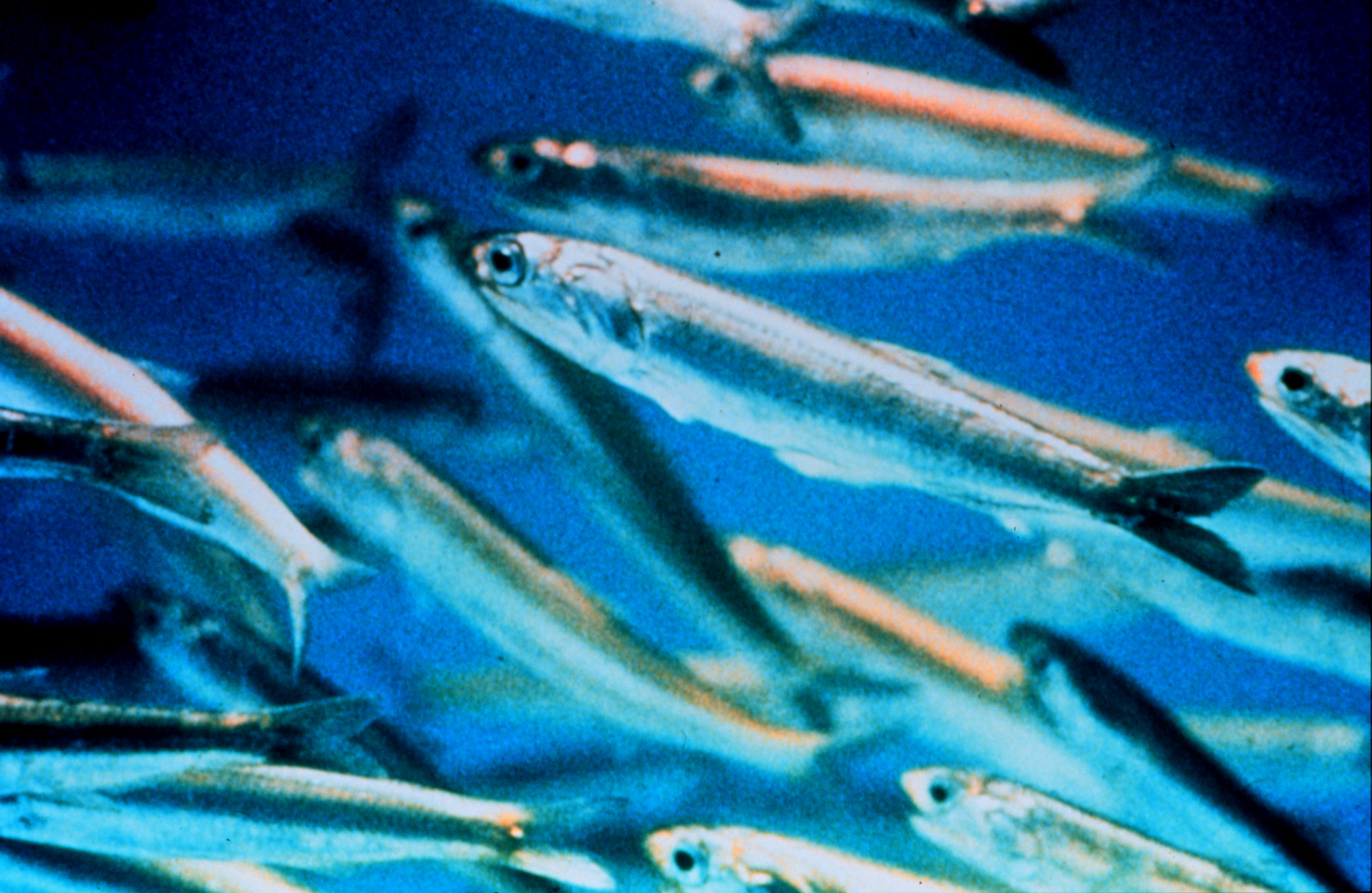

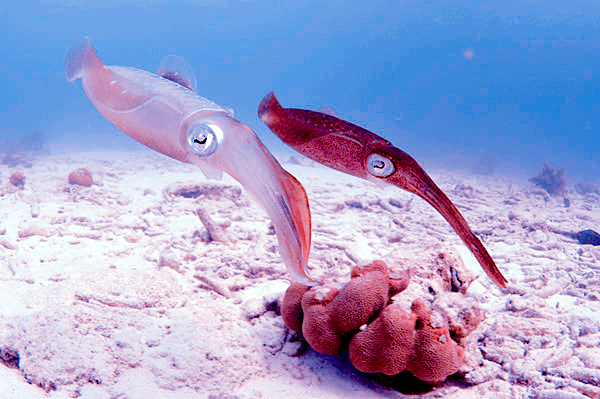

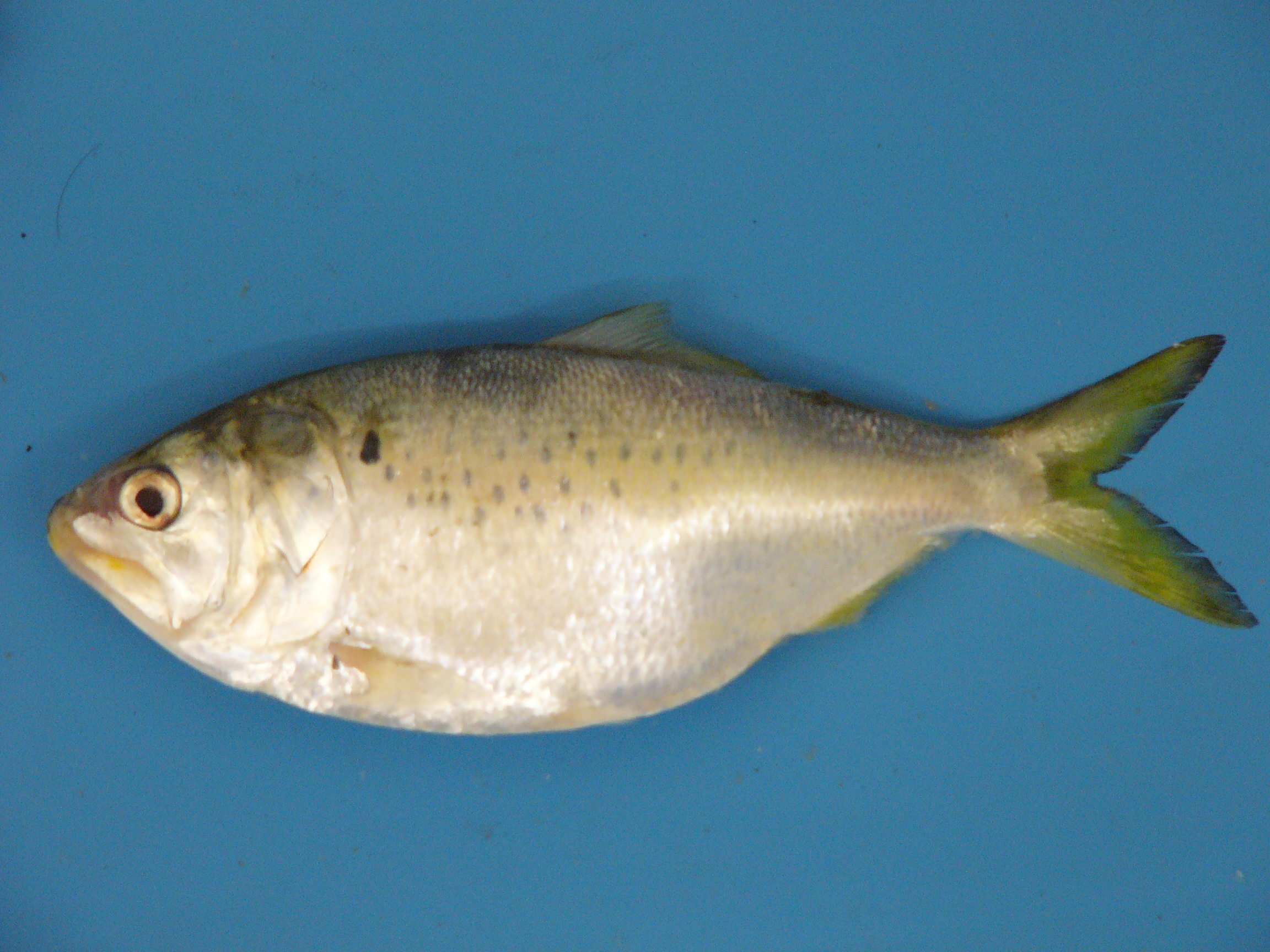

Anchovies
Caribbean reef squid
Menhaden

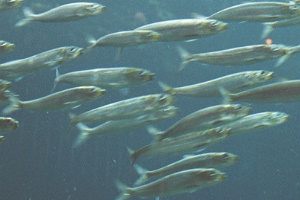

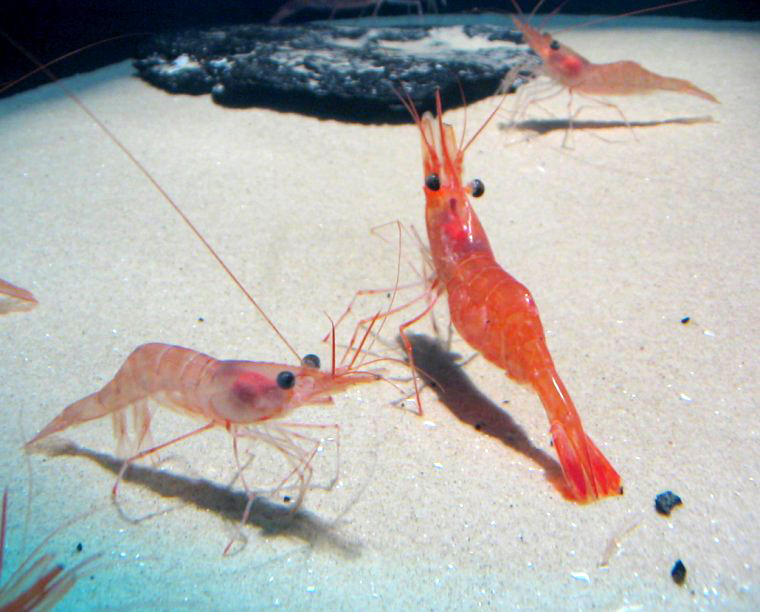

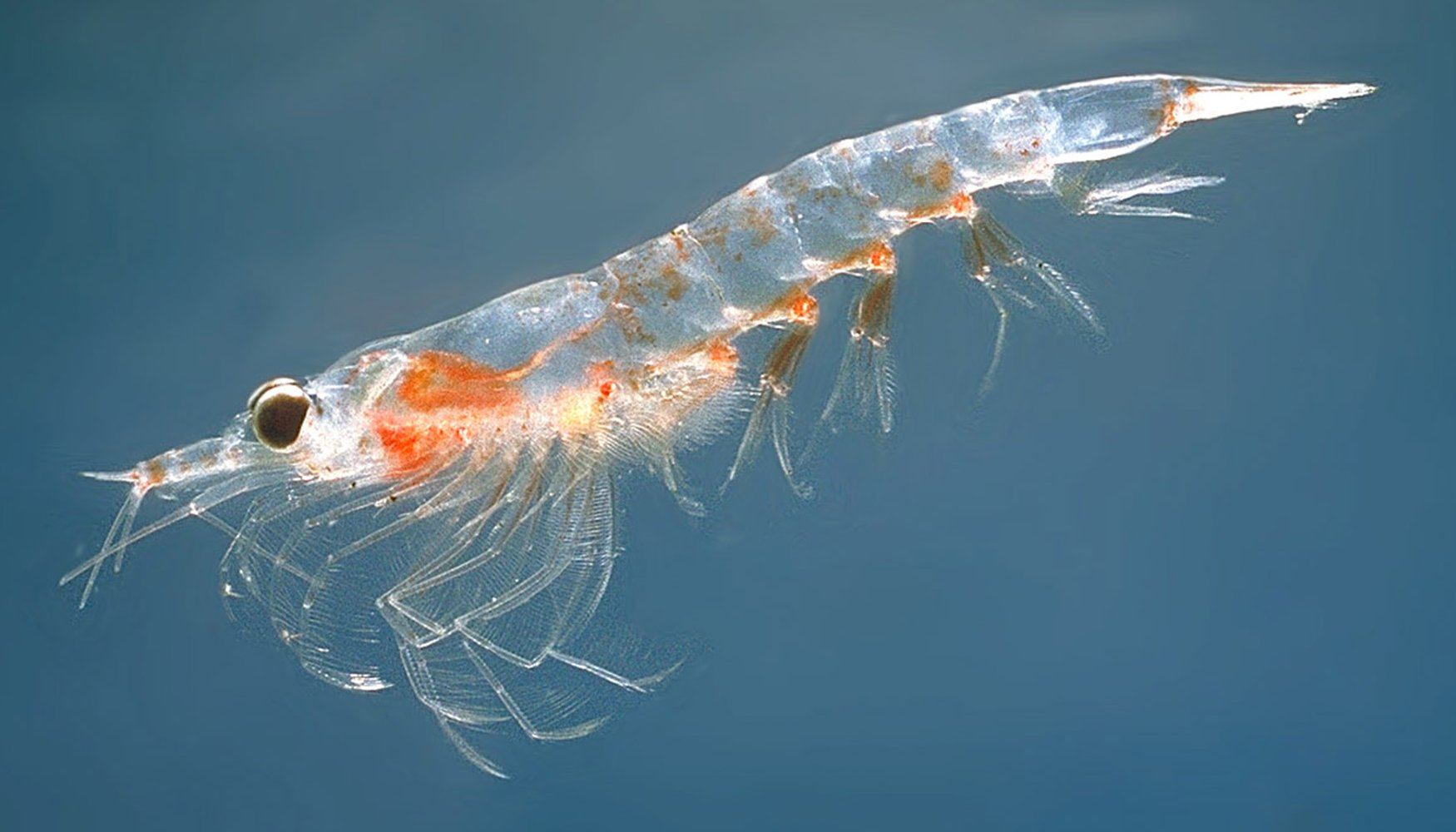

Sardines
Shrimp
Northern krill

Forage fish utilise the biomass of copepods, mysids and krill in the pelagic zone, serving as the predominant converters of the large amount of ocean zooplankton. They are, in turn, central prey items for higher trophic levels. Forage fish are able to efficiently filter zooplankton due to their schooling behavior of feeding in huge, and often extremely fast schools whose locations have been observed to correlate with plankton patches.

Though forage fish are abundant, there are relatively few species. There are more species of primary producers and apex predators in the ocean than there are forage fish.

=== Ocean food webs ===

Forage fish occupy central positions in the ocean food webs. The position that a fish occupies in a food web is called its trophic level (Greek trophē = food). The organisms it eats are at a lower trophic level, and the organisms that eat it are at a higher trophic level. Forage fish occupy middle levels in the food web, serving as a dominant prey to higher level fish, seabirds and mammals.

Ecological pyramids are graphical representations, along the lines of the diagram at the right, which show how biomass or productivity changes at each trophic level in an ecosystem. The first or bottom level is occupied by primary producers or autotrophs (Greek autos = self and trophe = food). These are the names given to organisms that do not feed on other organisms, but produce biomass from inorganic compounds, mostly by a process of photosynthesis.

In oceans, most primary production is performed by algae. This is a contrast to land, where most primary production is performed by vascular plants. Algae ranges from single floating cells to attached seaweeds, while vascular plants are represented in the ocean by groups such as the seagrasses. Larger producers, such as seagrasses and seaweeds, are mostly confined to the littoral zone and shallow waters, where they attach to the underlying substrate and are still within the photic zone. Most primary production in the ocean is performed by microscopic organisms, the phytoplankton.

Thus, in ocean environments, the first bottom trophic level is occupied principally by phytoplankton, microscopic drifting organisms, mostly one-celled algae, that float in the sea. Most phytoplankton are too small to be seen individually with the unaided eye. They can appear as a green discoloration of the water when they are present in high enough numbers. Since they increase their biomass mostly through photosynthesis they live in the sun-lit surface layer (euphotic zone) of the sea.

Phytoplankton form the base of the ocean foodchain

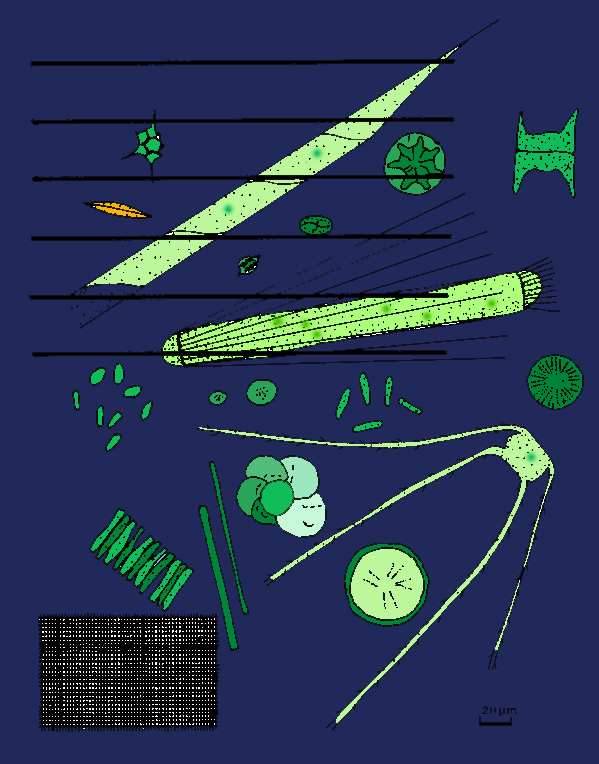

Phytoplankton

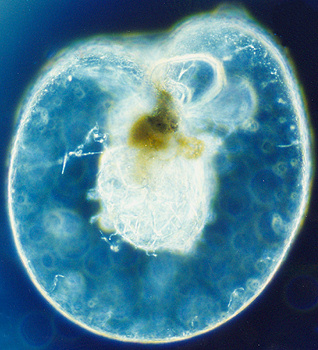

Dinoflagellate

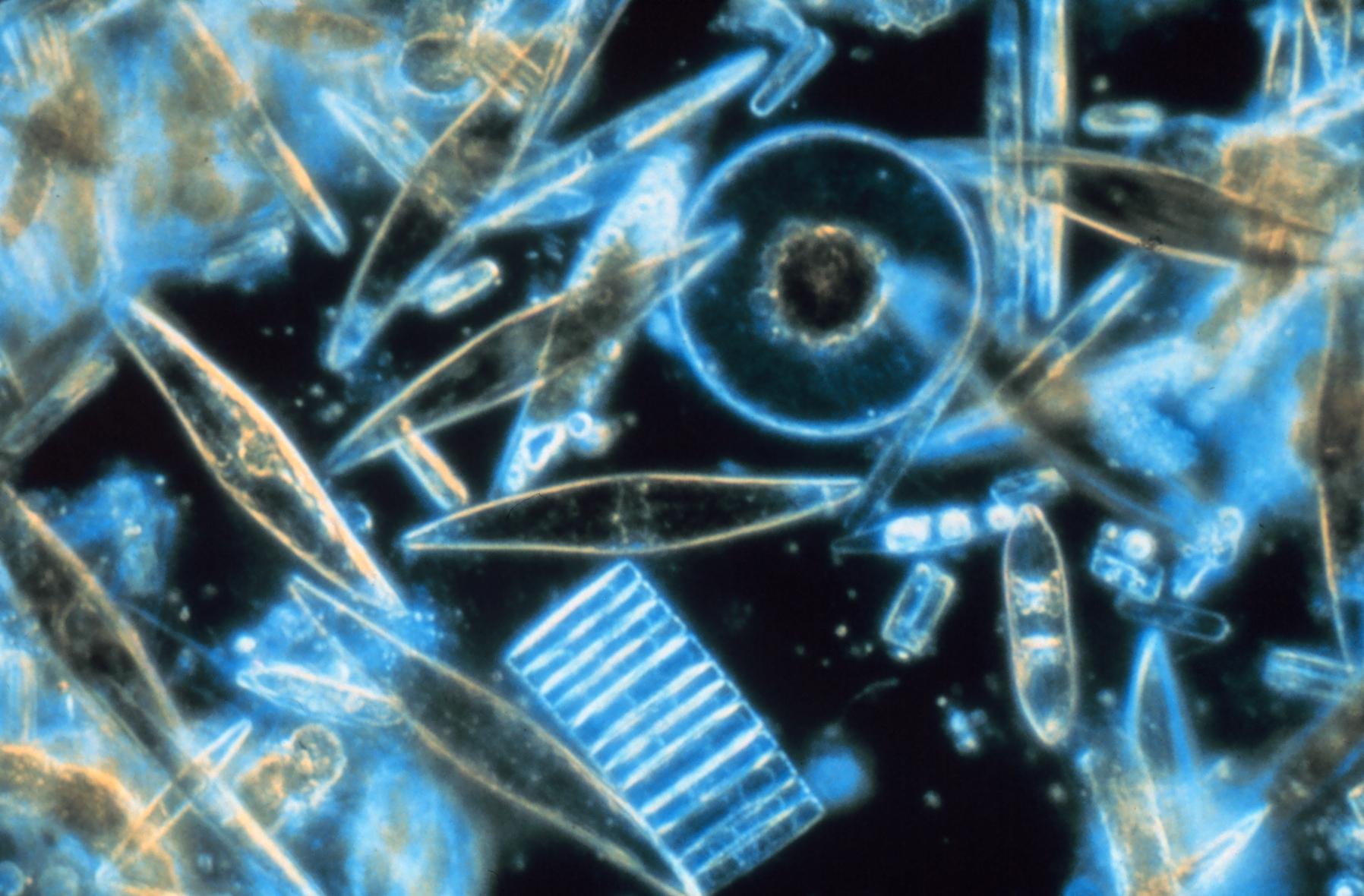

Diatoms

The most important groups of phytoplankton include the diatoms and dinoflagellates. Diatoms are especially important in oceans, where they are estimated to contribute up to 45% of the total ocean's primary production. Diatoms are usually microscopic, although some species can reach up to 2 millimetres (0.079 in) in length.

The second trophic level (primary consumers) is occupied by zooplankton which feed off the phytoplankton. Together with the phytoplankton, they form the base of the food pyramid that supports most of the world's great fishing grounds. Zooplankton are tiny animals found with the phytoplankton in oceanic surface waters, and include tiny crustaceans, and fish larvae and fry (recently hatched fish). Most zooplankton are filter feeders, and they use appendages to strain the phytoplankton in the water. Some larger zooplankton also feed on smaller zooplankton. Some zooplankton can jump about a bit to avoid predators, but they cannot really swim. Like phytoplankton, they float with the currents, tides and winds instead. Zooplankton can reproduce rapidly, their populations can increase up to thirty percent a day under favourable conditions. Many live short and productive lives and reach maturity quickly.

Zooplankton form the second level in the ocean food chain

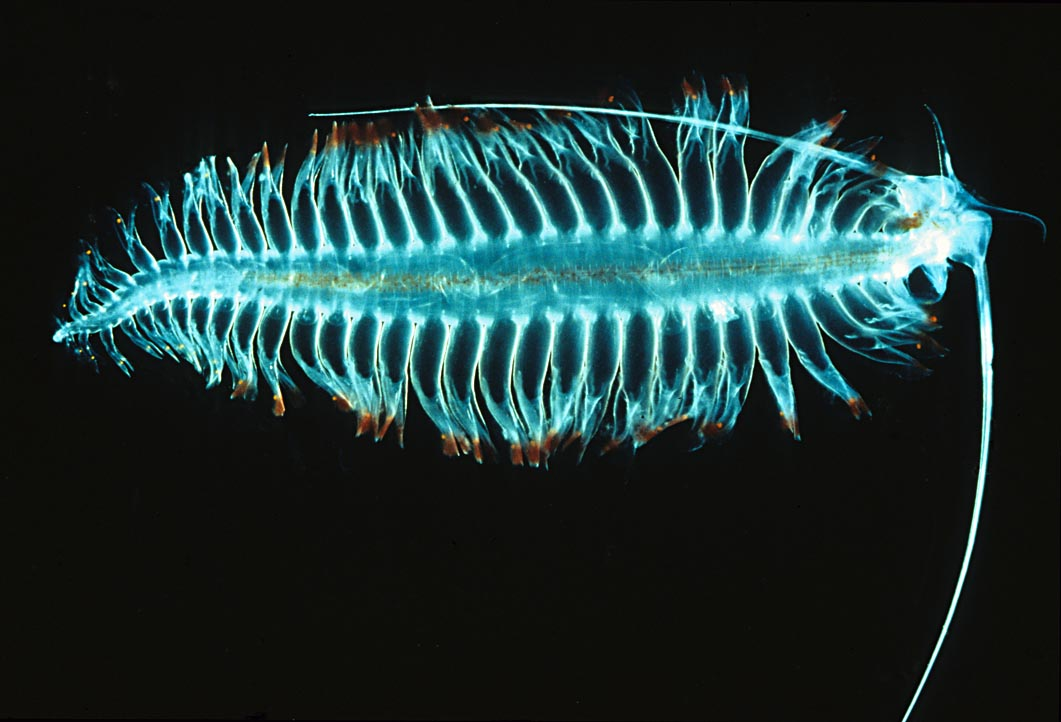

Segmented worm

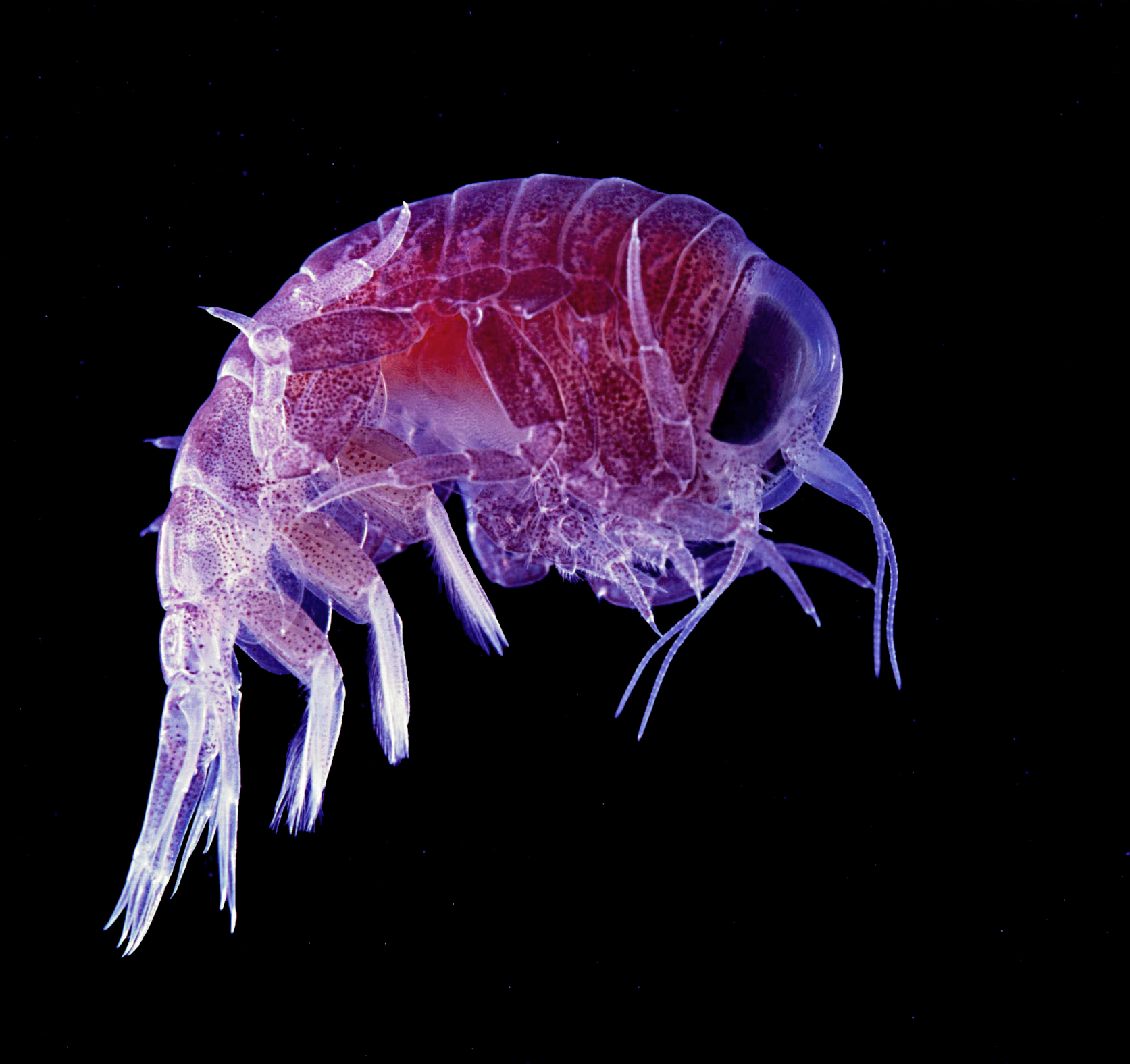

Tiny shrimp-like crustaceans

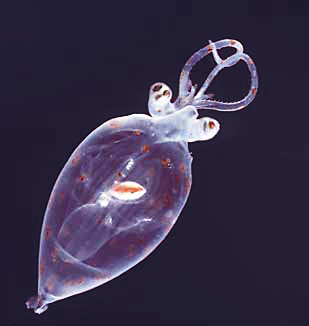

Juvenile planktonic squid

Particularly important groups of zooplankton are the copepods and krill. These are not shown in the images above, but are discussed in more detail later. Copepods are a group of small crustaceans found in ocean and freshwater habitats. They are the biggest source of protein in the sea, and are important prey for forage fish. Krill constitute the next biggest source of protein. Krill are particularly large predator zooplankton which feed on smaller zooplankton. This means they really belong to the third trophic level, secondary consumers, along with the forage fish.

Together, phytoplankton and zooplankton make up most of the plankton in the sea. Plankton is the term applied to any small drifting organisms that float in the sea (Greek planktos = wanderer or drifter). By definition, organisms classified as plankton are unable to swim against ocean currents; they cannot resist the ambient current and control their position. In ocean environments, the first two trophic levels are occupied mainly by plankton. Plankton are divided into producers and consumers. The producers are the phytoplankton (Greek phyton = plant) and the consumers, who eat the phytoplankton, are the zooplankton (Greek zoon = animal).

=== Diet ===
External images
- Forage fish and the food web
- Fishing down marine food webs

Forage fish feed on plankton. When they are eaten by larger predators, they transfer this energy from the bottom of the food chain to the top and in this way are the central link between trophic levels.

Forage fish are usually filter feeders, meaning that they feed by straining suspended matter and food particles from water. They usually travel in large, slow moving, tightly packed schools with their mouths open. They are typically omnivorous. Their diet is usually based primarily on zooplankton, although, since they are omnivorous, they also take in some phytoplankton.

Young forage fish, such as herring, mostly feed on phytoplankton and as they mature they start to consume larger organisms. Older herrings feed on zooplankton, tiny animals that are found in oceanic surface waters, and fish larvae and fry (recently hatched fish). Copepods and other tiny crustaceans are common zooplankton eaten by forage fish. During daylight, many forage fish stay in the safety of deep water, feeding at the surface only at night when there is less chance of predation. They swim with their mouths open, filtering plankton from the water as it passes through their gills.

Ocean halfbeaks are omnivores which feed on algae, plankton, marine plants like seagrass, invertebrates like pteropods, and crustaceans and smaller fishes. Some tropical species feed on animals during the day and plants at night, while others alternate summer carnivory with winter herbivory. They are in turn eaten by billfish, mackerel, and sharks.

=== Predators ===
Forage fish are the food that sustains larger predators above them in the ocean food chain. The superabundance they present in their schools make them ideal food sources for top predator fish such as tuna, striped bass, cod, salmon, barracuda and swordfish, as well as sharks, whales, dolphins, porpoises, seals, sea lions, and seabirds.

Ocean predators of forage fish

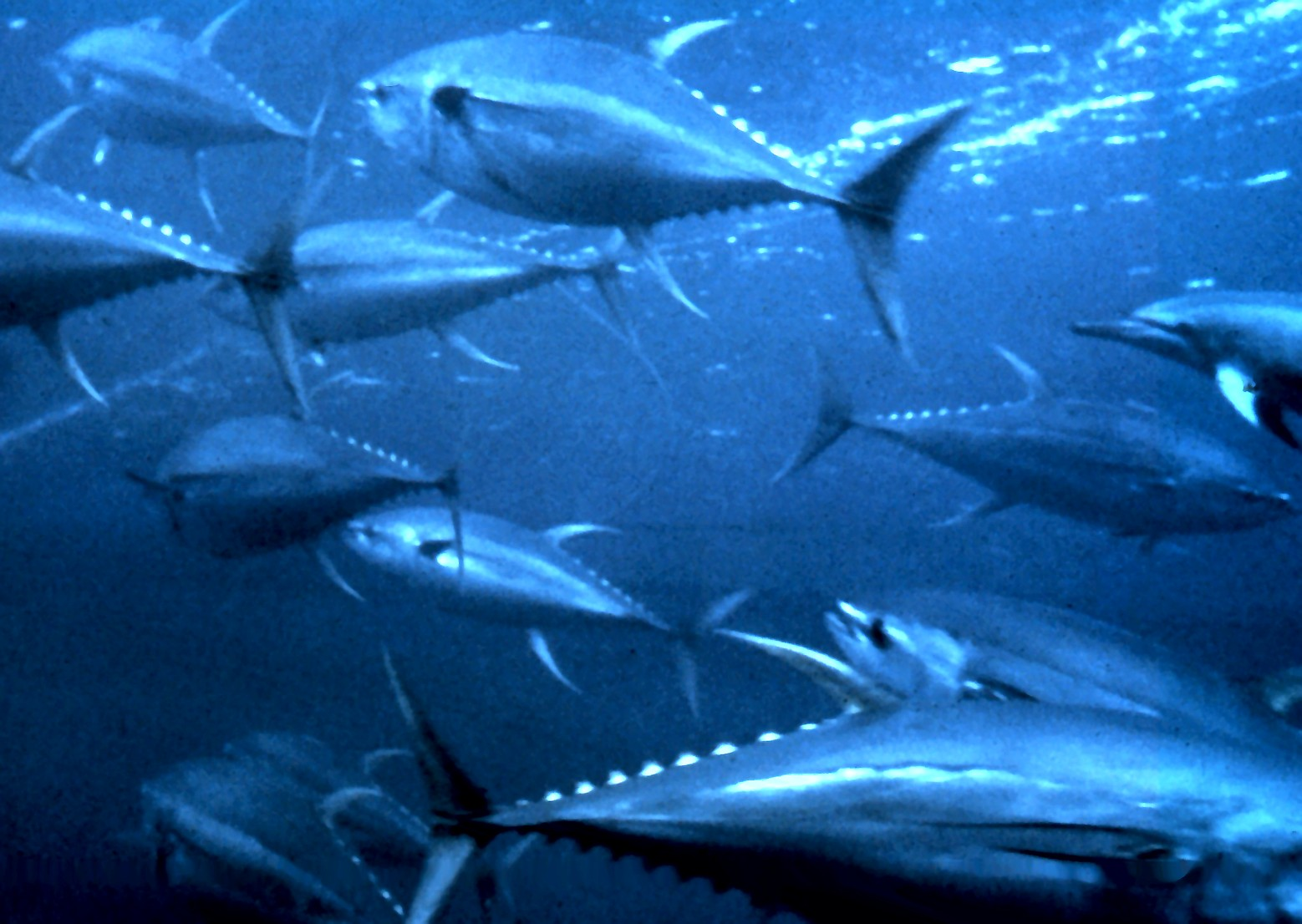

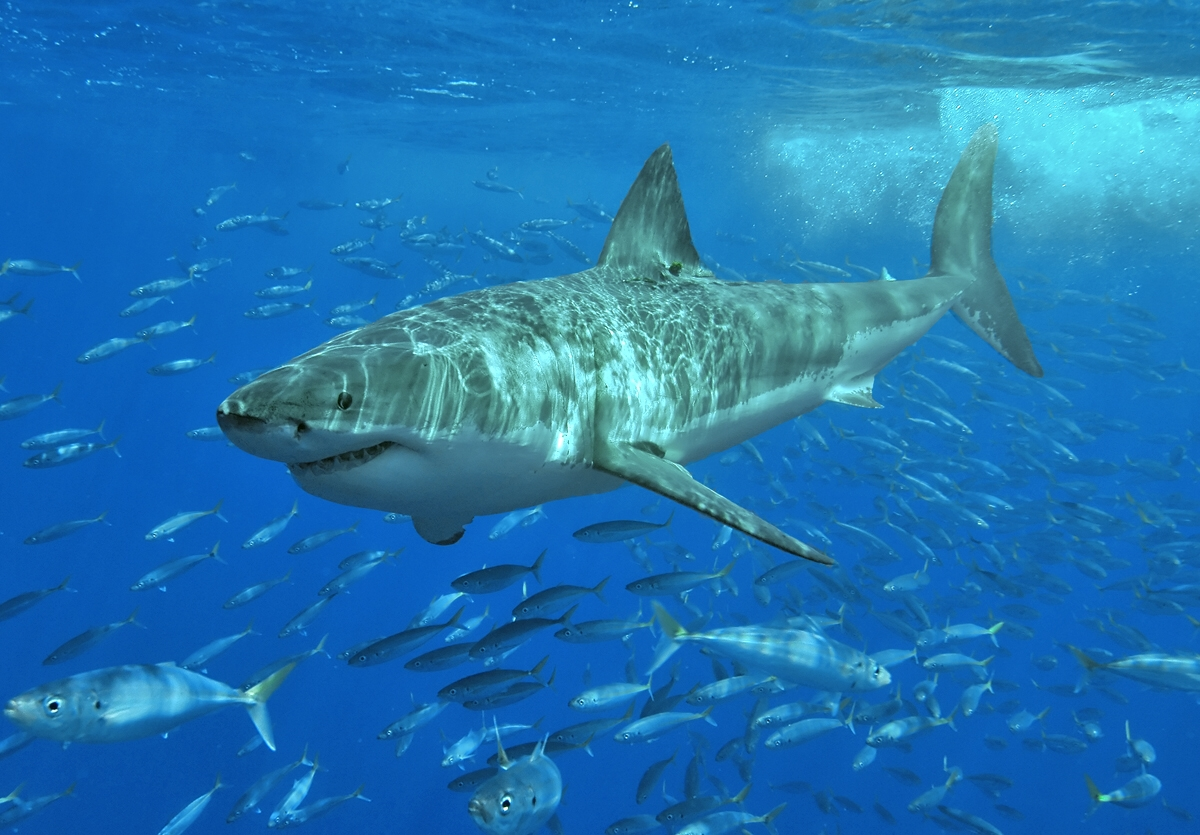

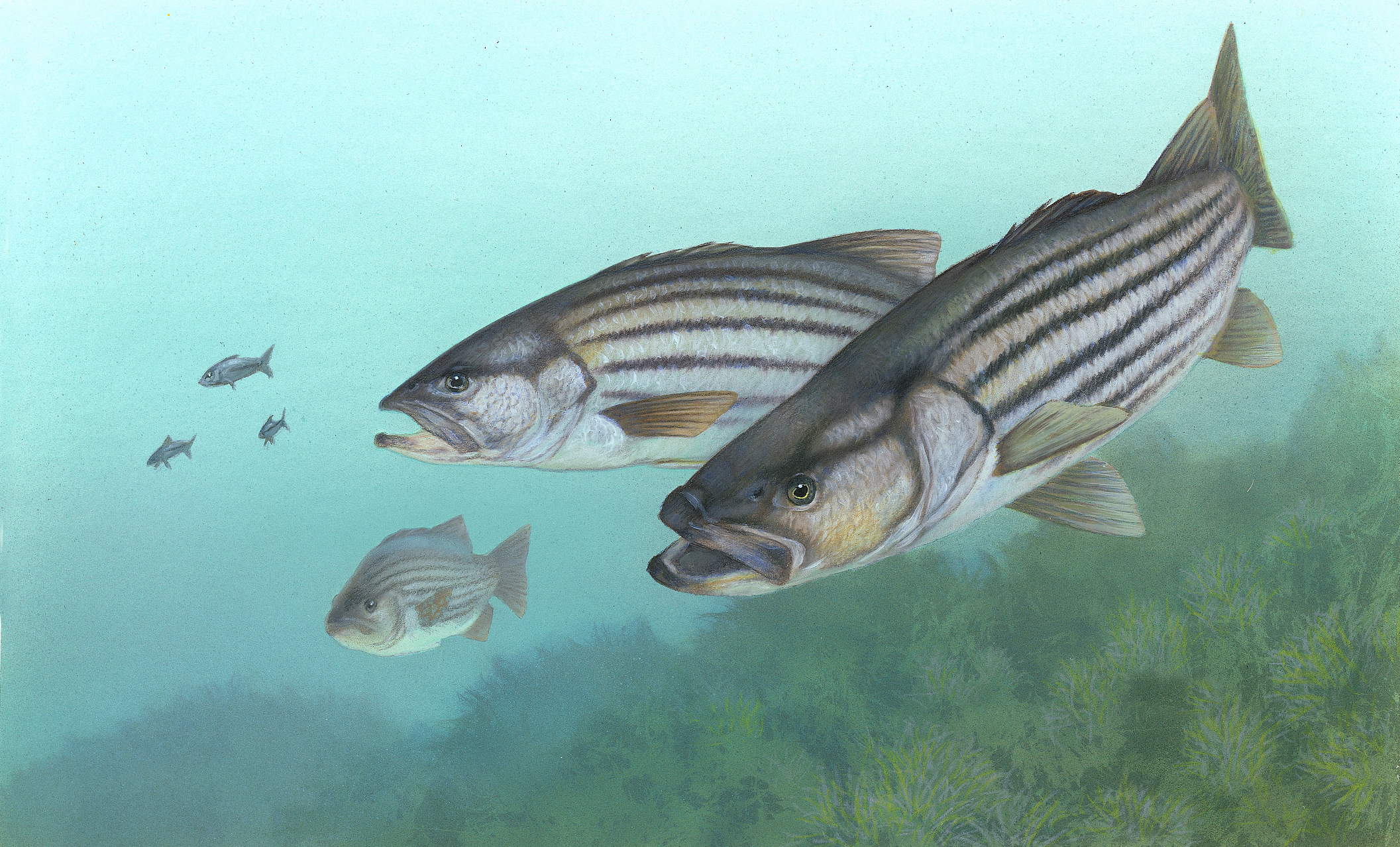

Tuna
Shark
Striped bass

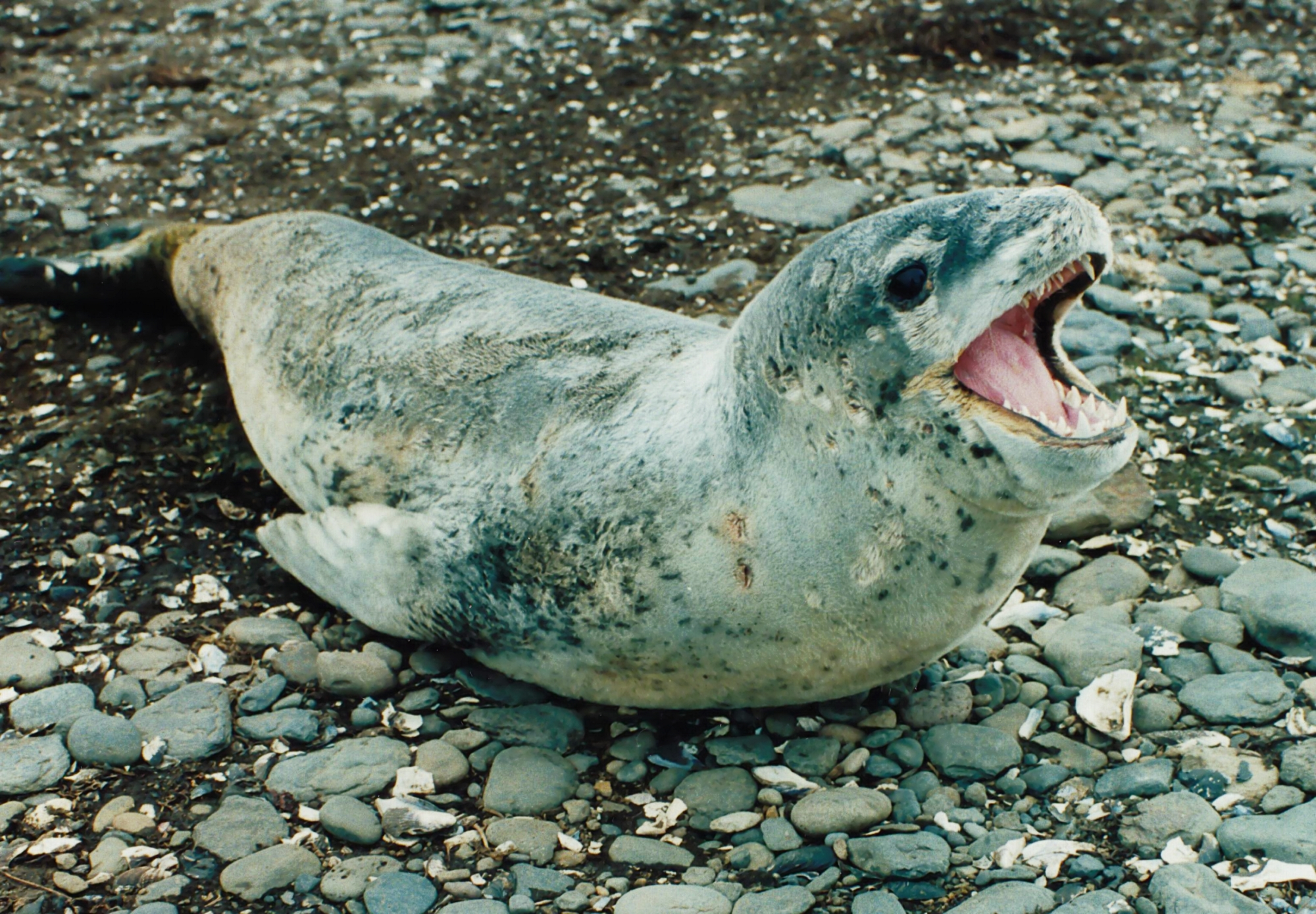

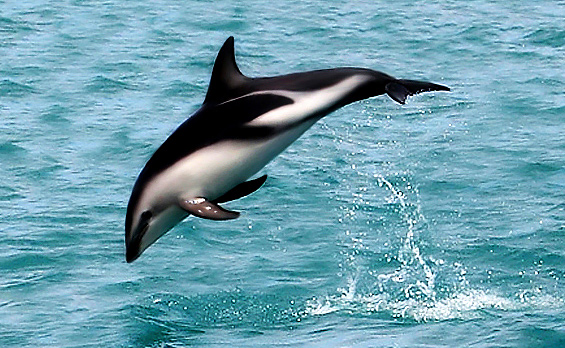

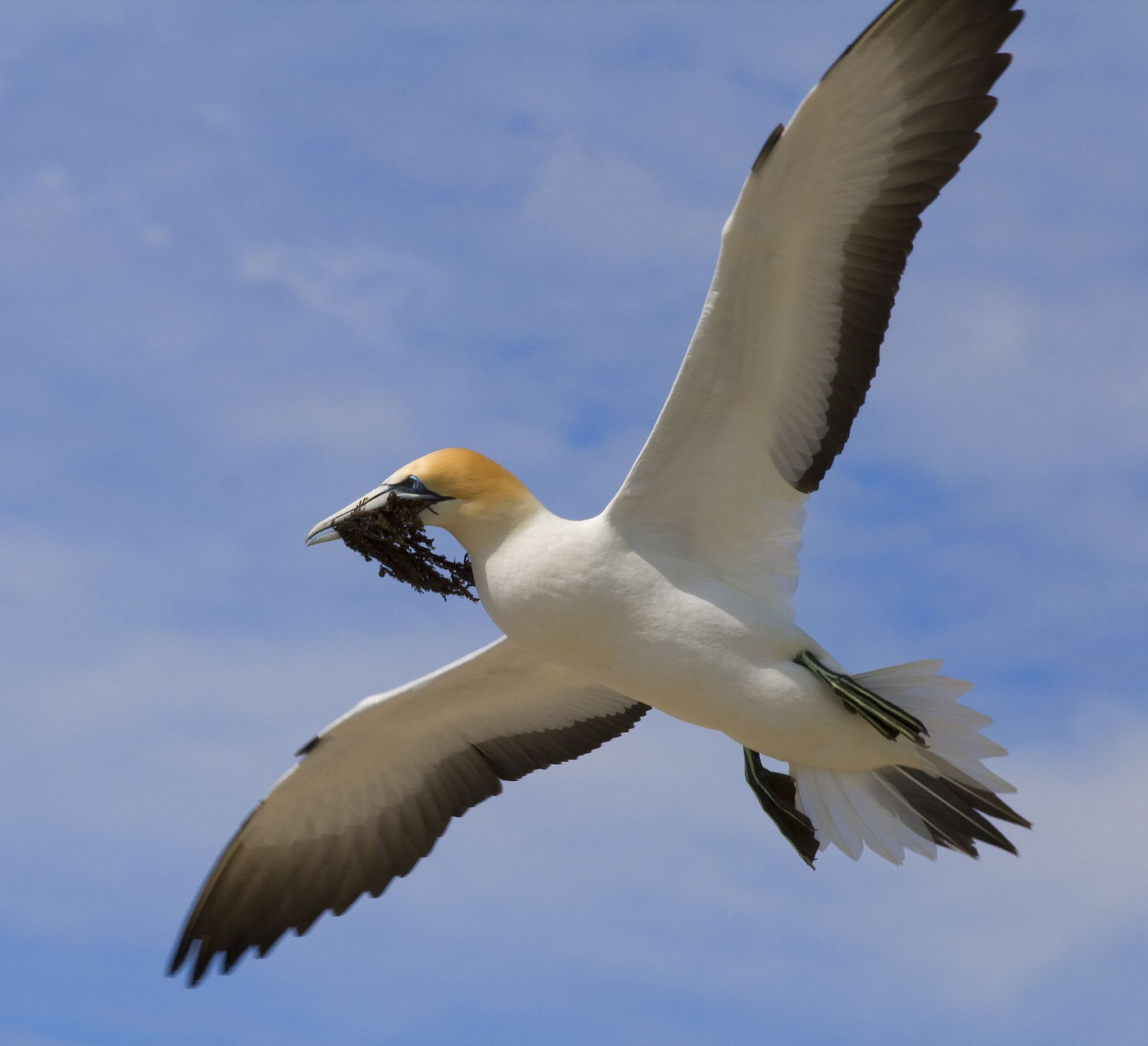

Leopard seal
Dolphin
Gannet

=== Schooling ===
Underwater video loop of a school of herrings migrating at high speed to their spawning grounds in the Baltic Sea

Forage fish are small, short-lived species that often form large schools. These groups play an important role in the marine food web by transferring energy from plankton to larger organisms. Most forage fish are pelagic fish, meaning they live in the open sea (pelagic zone) rather than the sea floor (benthic zone). Due to their high abundance, they act as a primary food source for many predators, prompting these predators to migrate long distances to locate and feed on forage fish populations.

Herring are among the most spectacular schooling fish. They aggregate together in huge numbers. Schools have been measured at over four cubic kilometres in size, containing about four billion fish. These schools move along coastlines and traverse the open oceans. Herring schools in general have very precise arrangements which allow the school to maintain relatively constant cruising speeds. Herrings have excellent hearing, and their schools react very fast to a predator. The herrings keep a certain distance from a moving scuba diver or cruising predator like a killer whale, forming a vacuole which can look like a doughnut from a spotter plane. The intricacies of schooling is far from fully understood, especially the swimming and feeding energetics. Many hypotheses to explain the function of schooling have been suggested, such as better orientation, synchronized hunting, predator confusion and reduced risk of being found. Schooling also has disadvantages, such as excretion buildup in the breathing media and oxygen and food depletion. The way the fish array in the school probably gives energy saving advantages, though this is controversial.

On calm days, schools of herring can be detected at the surface a mile away by little waves they form, or from several meters at night when they trigger bioluminescence in surrounding plankton. Underwater recordings show herring constantly cruising at high speeds up to 108 cm per second, with much higher escape speeds.

They are fragile fish, and because of their adaptation to schooling behaviour they are rarely displayed in aquaria. Even with the best facilities aquaria can offer they become sluggish compared to their quivering energy in wild schools.

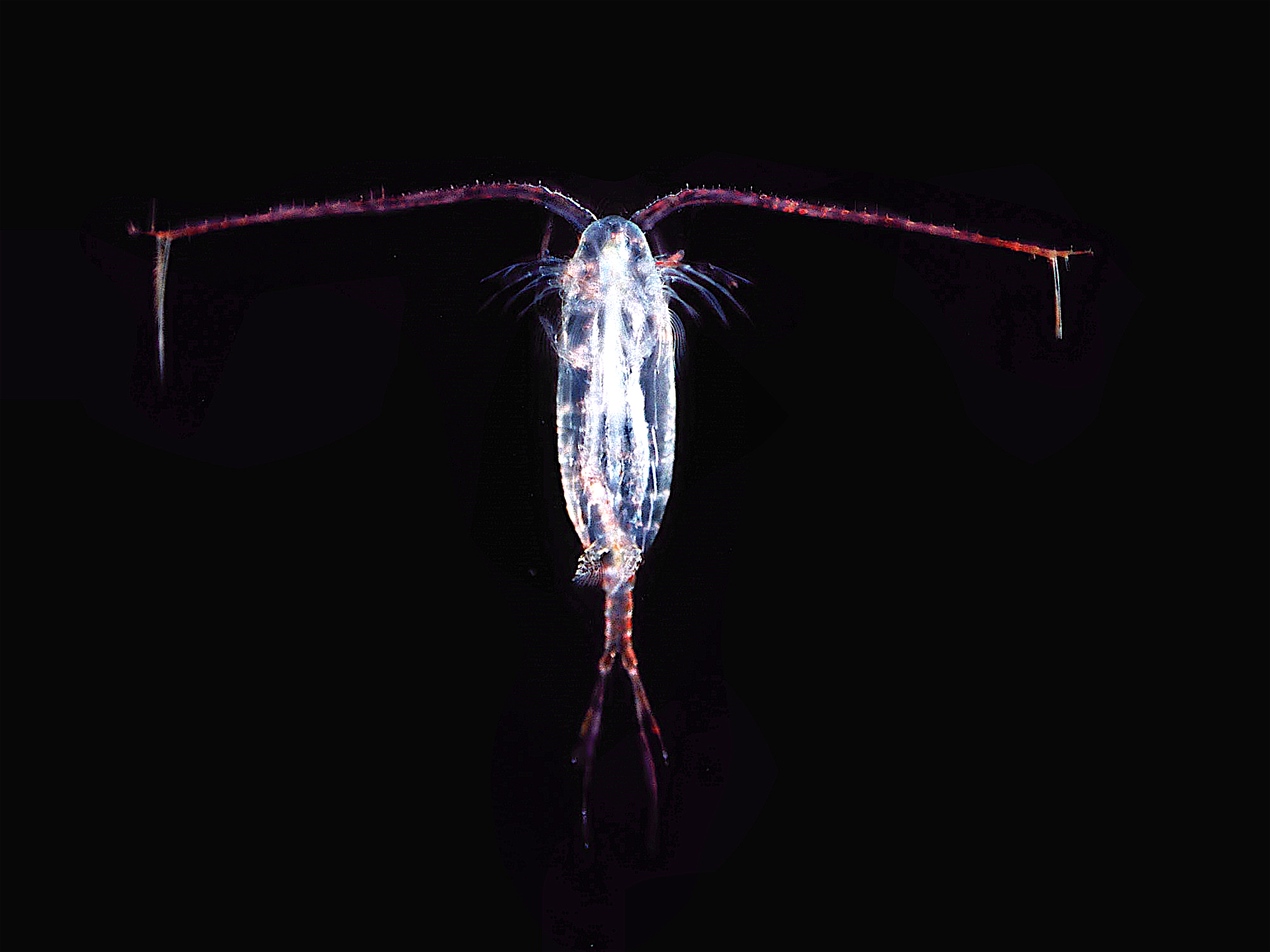
Copepod

Slow motion video loop of a juvenile herring feeding on copepods

=== Hunting copepods ===
Copepods are a group of small crustaceans found in ocean and freshwater habitats. Many species are planktonic (drifting in the ocean water), while others are benthic (living on the sea floor). Copepods are typically one millimetre (0.04 in) to two millimetres (0.08 in) long, with a teardrop-shaped body. Like other crustaceans they have an armoured exoskeleton, but they are so small that this armour, and the entire body, is usually transparent.

Copepods are usually the dominant zooplankton. Some scientists say they form the largest animal biomass on the planet. The other contender is the Antarctic krill. But copepods are smaller than krill, with faster growth rates, and they are more evenly distributed throughout the oceans. This means copepods almost certainly contribute more secondary production to the world's oceans than krill, and perhaps more than all other groups of marine organisms together.

Copepods are very alert and evasive. They have large antennae. When they spread their antennae they can sense the pressure wave from an approaching fish and jump with great speed over a few centimeters.

Herrings are pelagic feeders. Their prey consists of a wide spectrum of phytoplankton and zooplankton, amongst which copepods are the dominant prey. Young herring usually capture small copepods by hunting them individually—they approach them from below. The (half-speed) video loop at the left shows a juvenile herring feeding on copepods. In the middle of the image a copepod escapes successfully to the left. The opercula (hard bony flaps covering the gills) are spread wide open to compensate the pressure wave which would alert the copepod to trigger a jump.

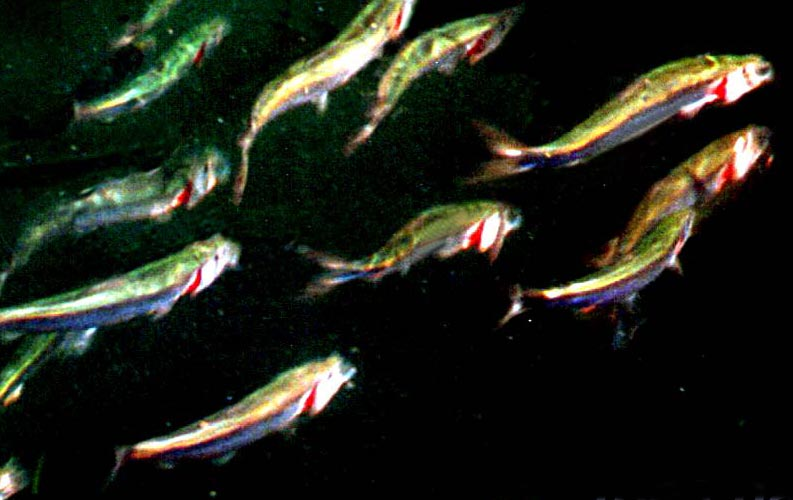
Herring ram-feeding on a school of copepods

Juvenile herring hunt for alert and evasive copepods in synchronization. (Click to animate.)

If prey concentrations reach very high levels, the herrings adopt a method called "ram feeding". They swim with their mouth wide open and their opercula fully expanded. Every several feet, they close and clean their gill rakers for a few milliseconds (filter feeding). In the photo on the right, herring ram feed on a school of copepods. The fish all open their mouths and opercula wide at the same time (the red gills are visible—click to enlarge). The fish swim in a grid where the distance between them is the same as the jump length of their prey, as indicated in the animation below.

In the animation, juvenile herring hunt the copepods in synchronization: The copepods sense with their antennae the pressure wave of an approaching herring and react with a fast escape jump. The length of the jump is fairly constant. The fish align themselves in a grid with this characteristic jump length. A copepod can dart about 80 times before it tires out. After a jump, it takes it 60 milliseconds to spread its antennae again, and this time delay becomes its undoing, as the almost endless stream of herrings allows a herring to eventually snap the copepod. A single juvenile herring could never catch a large copepod.

=== Migrations ===
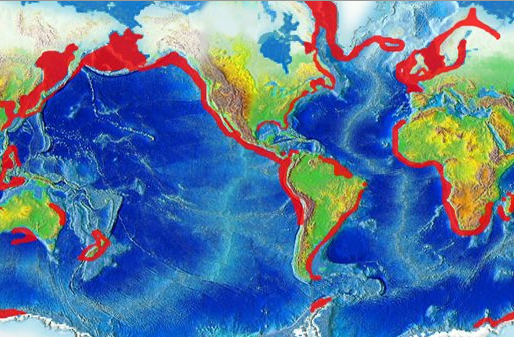
Coastal upwellings can provide plankton-rich feeding grounds for forage fish.

Migration of Icelandic capelin

Forage fish often make great migrations between their spawning, feeding and nursery grounds. Schools of a particular stock usually travel in a triangle between these grounds. For example, one stock of herrings have their spawning ground in southern Norway, their feeding ground in Iceland, and their nursery ground in northern Norway. Wide triangular journeys such as these may be important because forage fish, when feeding, cannot distinguish their own offspring.

Fertile feeding grounds for forage fish are provided by ocean upwellings. Oceanic gyres are large-scale ocean currents caused by the Coriolis effect. Wind-driven surface currents interact with these gyres and the underwater topography, such as seamounts and the edge of continental shelves, to produce downwellings and upwellings. These can transport nutrients which plankton thrive on. The result can be rich feeding grounds attractive to the plankton feeding forage fish. In turn, the forage fish themselves become a feeding ground for larger predator fish. Most upwellings are coastal, and many of them support some of the most productive fisheries in the world. Regions of notable upwelling include coastal Peru, Chile, Arabian Sea, western South Africa, eastern New Zealand and the California coast.

Capelin are a forage fish of the smelt family found in the Atlantic and Arctic oceans. In summer, they graze on dense swarms of plankton at the edge of the ice shelf. Larger capelin also eat krill and other crustaceans. The capelin move inshore in large schools to spawn and migrate in spring and summer to feed in plankton rich areas between Iceland, Greenland, and Jan Mayen. The migration is affected by ocean currents. Around Iceland maturing capelin make large northward feeding migrations in spring and summer. The return migration takes place in September to November. The spawning migration starts north of Iceland in December or January.

The diagram on the right shows the main spawning grounds and larval drift routes. Capelin on the way to feeding grounds is coloured green, capelin on the way back is blue, and the breeding grounds are red. In a paper published in 2009, researchers from Iceland recount their application of an interacting particle model to the capelin stock around Iceland, successfully predicting the spawning migration route for 2008.

=== Predator attacks ===
Schooling forage fish are subject to constant attacks by predators. An example is the attacks that take place during the African sardine run. The African sardine run is a spectacular migration by millions of silvery sardines along the southern coastline of Africa. In terms of biomass, the sardine run could rival East Africa's great wildebeest migration.

External images
- Dolphins herd sardines
- Gannets "divebomb" sardines

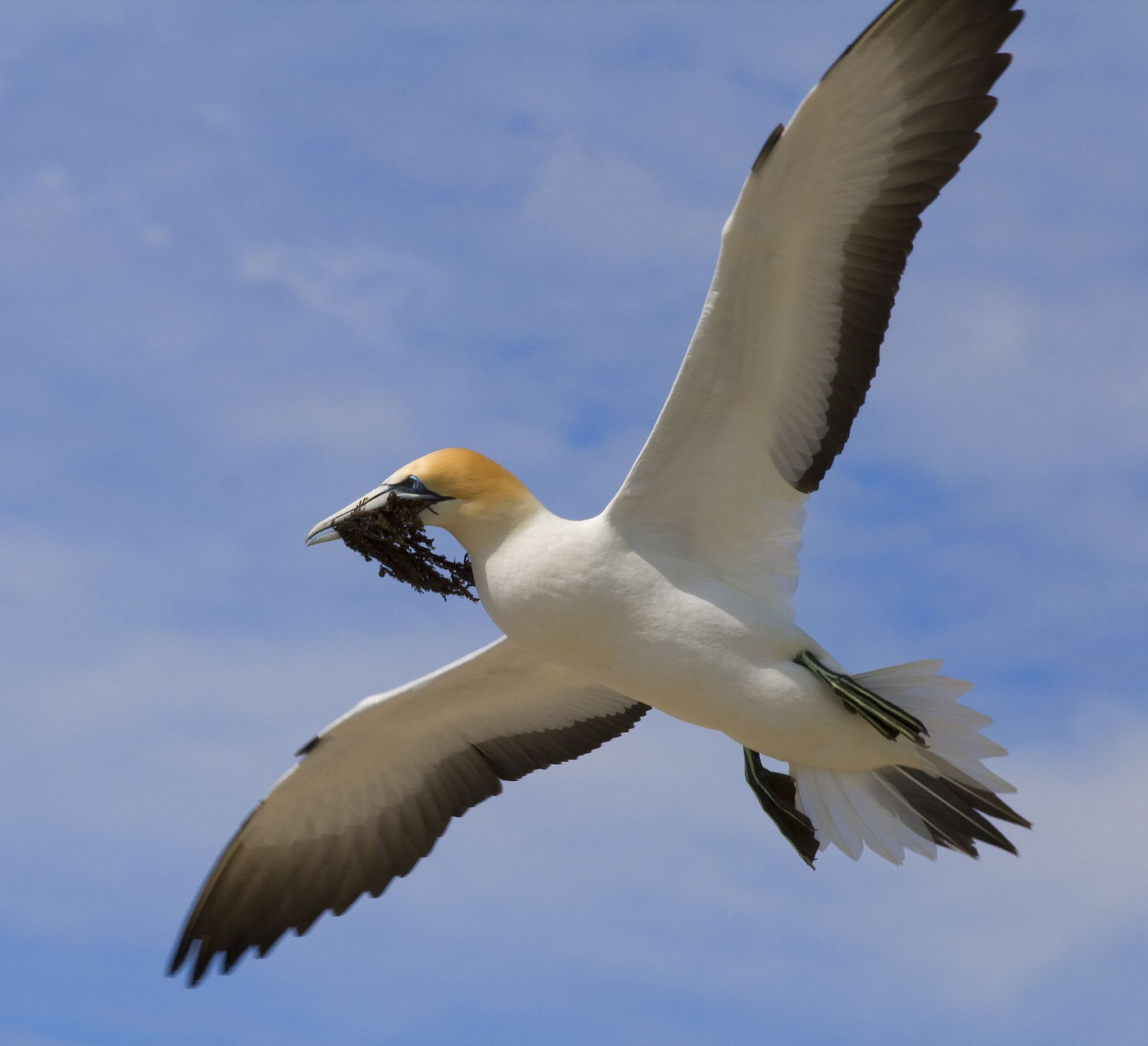
Gannet

Sardines have a short life-cycle, living only two or three years. Adult sardines, about two years old, mass on the Agulhas Bank where they spawn during spring and summer, releasing tens of thousands of eggs into the water. The adult sardines then make their way in hundreds of shoals towards the sub-tropical waters of the Indian Ocean. A larger shoal might be 7 kilometers (4.3 miles) long, 1.5 kilometers (0.93 miles) wide and 30 meters (98 feet) deep. Huge numbers of sharks, dolphins, tuna, sailfish, Cape fur seals and even killer whales congregate and follow the shoals, creating a feeding frenzy along the coastline.

When threatened, sardines instinctively group together and create massive bait balls. Bait balls can be up to 20 meters (66 feet) in diameter. They are short lived, seldom lasting longer than 20 minutes. As many as 18,000 dolphins, behaving like sheepdogs, round the sardines into these bait balls, or herd them to shallow water (corralling) where they are easier to catch. Once rounded up, the dolphins and other predators take turns plowing through the bait balls, gorging on the fish as they sweep through. Seabirds also attack them from above, flocks of gannets, cormorants, terns and gulls. Some of these seabirds plummet from heights of 30 metres (98 feet), plunging through the water leaving vapour-like trails behind like fighter planes.

The eggs, left behind at the Agulhas Banks, drift northwest with the current into waters off the west coast, where the larvae develop into juvenile fish. When they are old enough, they aggregate into dense shoals and migrate southwards, returning to the Agulhas banks in order to restart the cycle.

== Forage fisheries ==
=== History ===
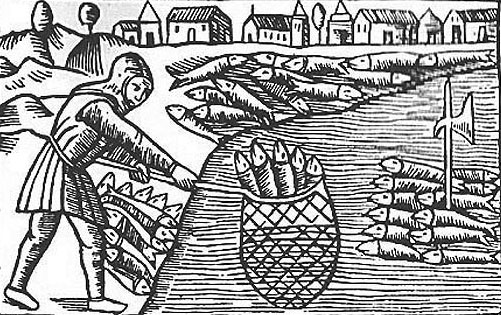
Medieval herring fishing in Scania (published 1555).

Herring has been known as a staple food source since 3000 B.C. In Roman times, anchovies were the base for the fermented fish sauce called garum. This staple of cuisine was produced in industrial quantities and transported over long distances.

Fishing for sardela or sardina (Sardina pilchardus) is an ongoing activity on the Croatian Adriatic coasts of Dalmatia and Istria. It traces its roots back thousands of years. The region was then largely a Venetian dominion, part of the Roman Empire. The area has always been sustained through fishing mainly sardines. Along the coast towns still promote the traditional practice of fishing by lateen sail boats for tourism and festivals.

Pilchard fishing and processing thrived in Cornwall between 1750 and 1880, after which stocks went into an almost terminal decline. Recently (2007) stocks have been improving. The industry has featured in many works of art, including Stanhope Forbes and other Newlyn School artists.

=== Contemporary ===
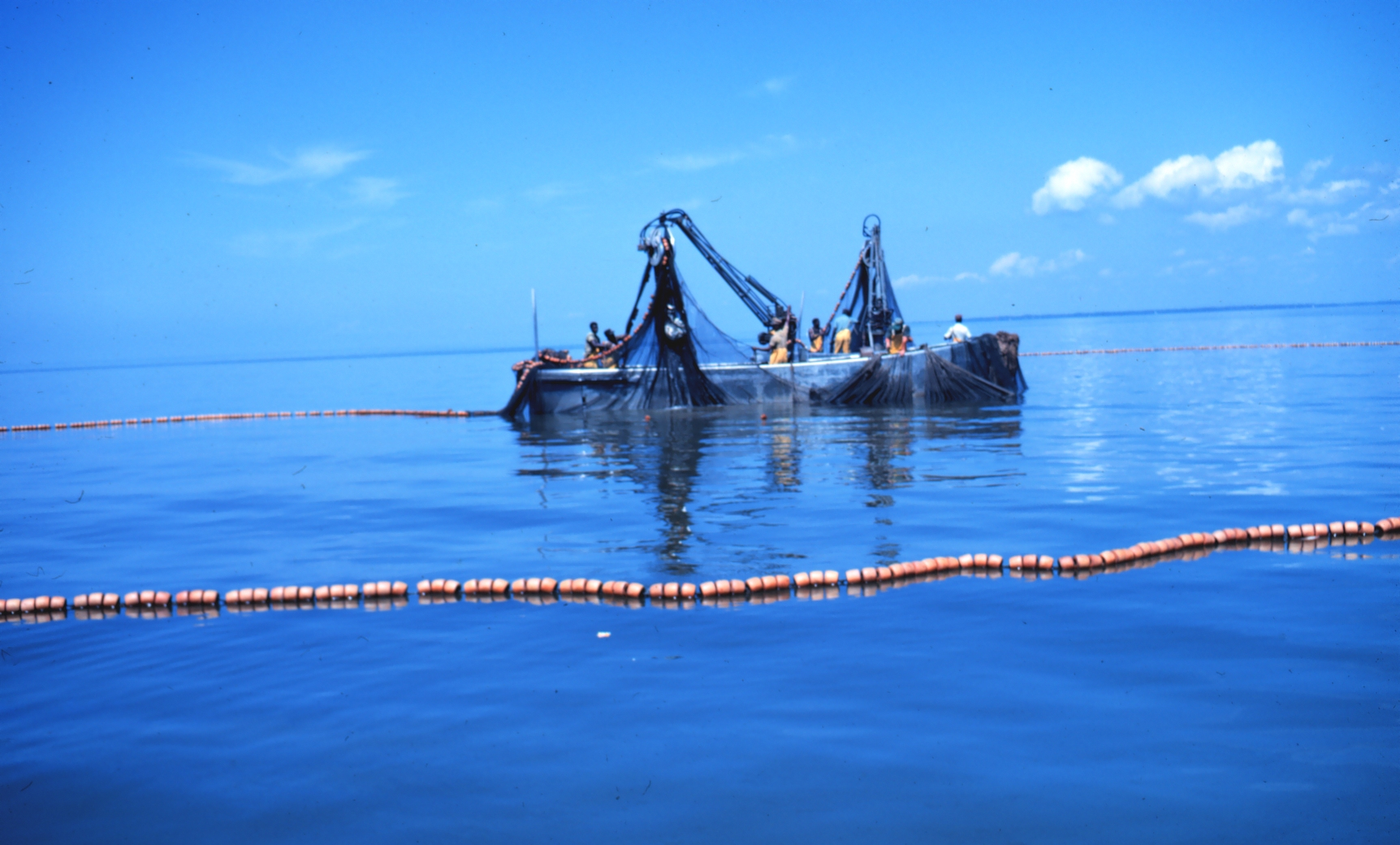
Purse seine boats encircling a school of menhaden

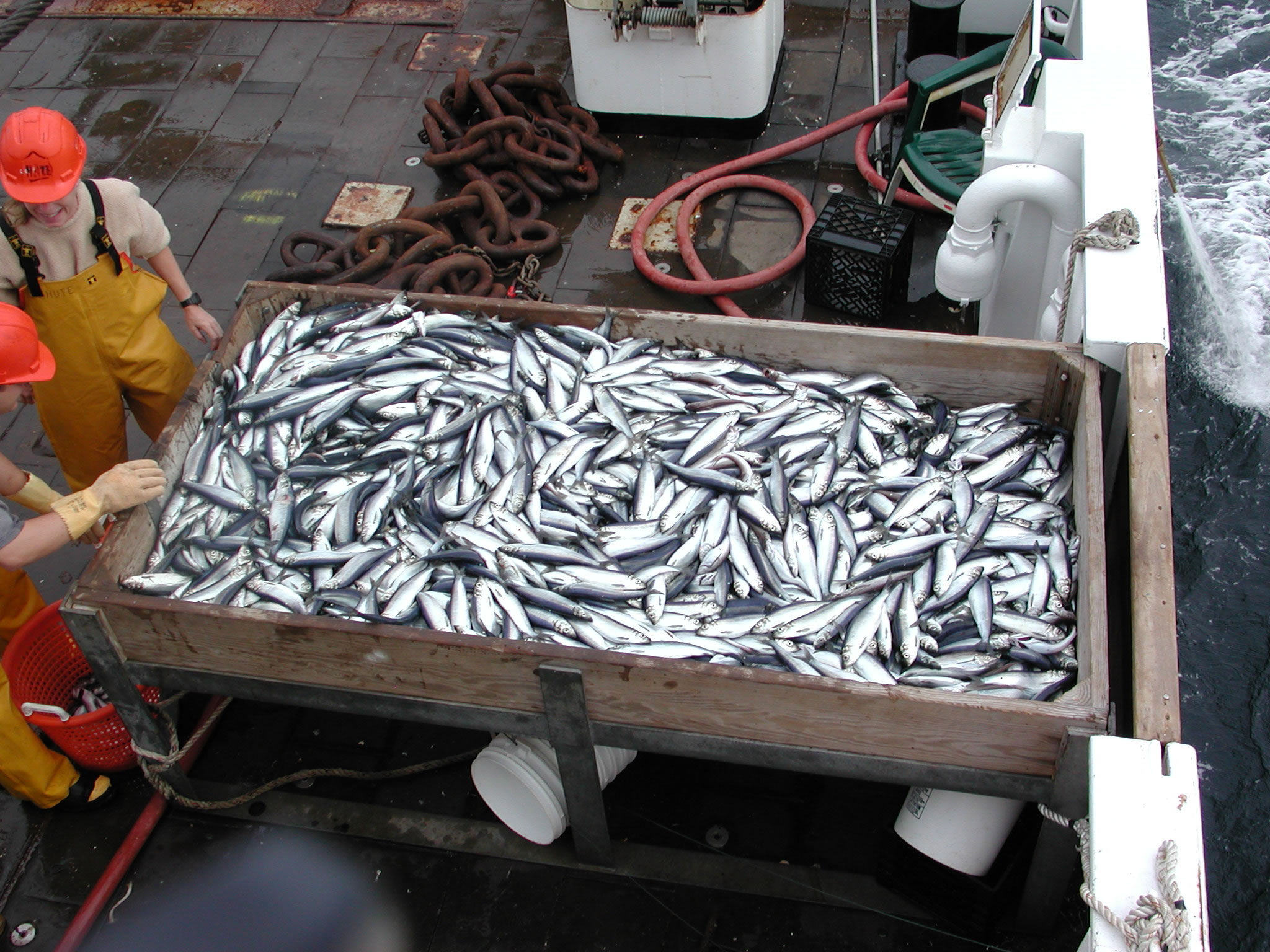
Commercial herring catch

Traditional commercial fisheries were directed towards high value ocean predators such as cod, rockfish and tuna, rather than forage fish. As technologies developed, fisheries became so effective at locating and catching predator fish that many of the stocks collapsed. The industry compensated by turning to species lower in the food chain.

In former times, forage fish were more difficult to fish profitably, and were a small part of the global marine fisheries. But modern industrial fishing technologies have enabled the removal of increasing quantities. Industrial-scale forage fish fisheries need large scale landings of fish to return profits. They are dominated by a small number of corporate fishing and processing companies.

Forage fish populations are very vulnerable when faced with modern fishing equipment. They swim near the surface in compacted schools, so they are relatively easy to locate at the surface with sophisticated electronic fishfinders and from above with spotter planes. Once located, they are scooped out of the water using highly efficient nets, such as purse seines, which remove most of the school.

Spawning patterns in forage fish are highly predictable. Some fisheries use knowledge of these patterns to harvest the forage species as they come together to spawn, removing the fish before they have actually spawned. Fishing during spawning periods or at other times when forage fish amass in large numbers can also be a blow to predators. Many predators, such as whales, tuna and sharks, have evolved to migrate long distances to specific sites for feeding and breeding. Their survival hinges on their finding these forage schools at their feeding grounds. The great ocean predators find that, no matter how they are adapted for speed, size, endurance or stealth, they are on the losing side when faced with the machinery of contemporary industrial fishing.

Altogether, forage fish account for 37 percent (31.5 million tonnes) of all fish taken from the world's oceans each year. However, because there are fewer species of forage fish compared to predator fish, forage species fisheries are the largest in the world. Seven of the top ten fisheries target forage fish. The total world catch of herrings, sardines and anchovies alone in 2005 was 22.4 million tonnes, 24 percent of the total world catch.

The Peruvian anchoveta fishery is now the biggest in the world (10.7 million tonnes in 2004), while the Alaskan pollock fishery in the Bering Sea is the largest single species fishery in the world (3 million tonnes). The Alaskan pollock is said to be the largest remaining single species source of palatable fish in the world. However, the biomass of pollock has declined in recent years, perhaps spelling trouble for both the Bering Sea ecosystem and the commercial fishery it supports. Acoustic surveys by NOAA indicate that the 2008 pollock population is almost 50 percent lower than last year's survey levels. Some scientists think this decline in Alaska pollock could repeat the collapse experienced by Atlantic cod, which could have negative consequences for the entire Bering Sea ecosystem. Salmon, halibut, endangered Steller sea lions, fur seals, and humpback whales eat pollock and depend on healthy populations to sustain themselves.

=== Use as animal feed ===
Eighty percent of the forage fish caught are fed to animals, in large part due to the high content of beneficial long chain omega-3 fatty acids in their flesh. Ninety percent is processed into fishmeal and fish oil. Of this, 46 percent was fed to farmed fish, 24 percent to pigs, and 22 percent to poultry (2002). Six times the weight of forage fish is fed to pigs and poultry alone than the entire seafood consumption of the U.S. market. One of the most promising alternatives to fish oil as a source of long chain omega-3 fatty acids and certain amino acids is algal oil from microalgae, the original source of these fatty acids in forage fish.

According to Turchini and De Silva (2008), another 2.5 million tonnes of the annual forage fish catch is consumed by the global cat food industry. In Australia, pet cats eat 13.7 kilograms of fish a year compared to the 11 kilograms eaten by the average Australian. The pet food industry is increasingly marketing premium and super-premium products, when different raw materials, such as the by-products of the fish filleting industry, could be used instead.

=== Environmental issues ===
In 2008 the Sea Around Us Project completed a nine-year study of forage fish led by the fisheries scientists Jacqueline Alder and Daniel Pauly. They concluded that...

1. The composition of landings of forage fish fisheries have changed over the past 50 years with the trophic level of fish used in fishmeal increasing over the past 20 years.
2. Our understanding of the role of forage fish in marine ecosystem and the impact of fishing is still limited.
3. Landing of forage fish peaked by the 1970s, and these high levels are highly unlikely in the future, even if fisheries are managed sustainably.
4. The consumption of forage fish by seabirds and marine mammals is not likely to be onerous to fisheries, except in a few localized areas. By contrast, fisheries, by reducing the biomass of small pelagics, might pose a threat to these predators, particularly to those species for which stocks have been heavily depleted by human exploitation in the past.
5. Some forage fish species are consumed by many people with consumption patterns changing over the last 20 years.
6. Aquaculture continues to increase its consumption of fishmeal and fish oil.

In 2015 sardine populations crashed along the west coast of the United States, causing the fishery to close early and remain closed through the 2015–2016 season. In an effort to provide some relief from the pressure put on forage fish populations, the World Bank along with the University of Arizona, Monterey Bay Aquarium and the New England Aquarium has sponsored a competition called the F3 (Fish-Free Feed) Challenge, which will award $200,000 to the most successful fish feed manufacturer who develops aquaculture feeds not made from fish.

== In lakes and rivers ==
Forage fish also inhabit freshwater habitats, such as lakes and rivers, where they serve as food for larger freshwater predators. Usually smaller than 15 centimetres (6 in) in length, these small bait fish make up most of the fish found in lakes and rivers. The minnow family alone, consisting of minnows, chubs, shiners and daces, consists of more than fifty species. Other freshwater forage fish include suckers, killifish, shad, bony fish as well as fish of the sunfish family, excluding black basses and crappie, and smaller species of the carp family. There are also anadromous forage fish, such as eulachon.

Freshwater forage fish

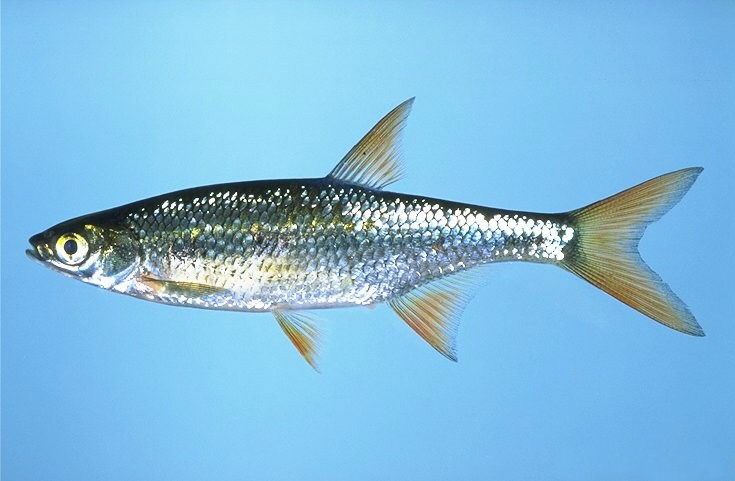

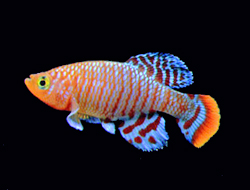

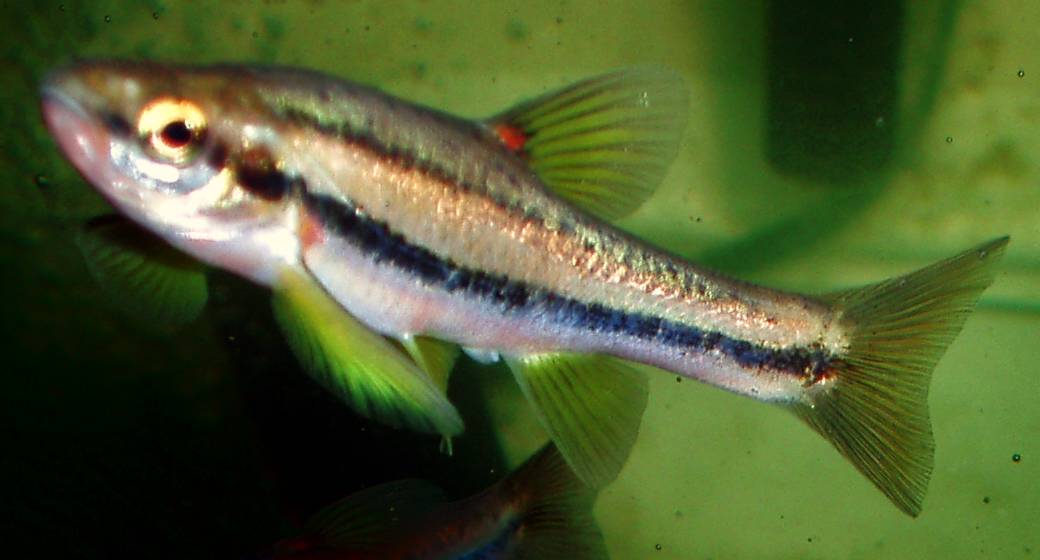

Golden shiner
Killifish
Southern redbelly dace

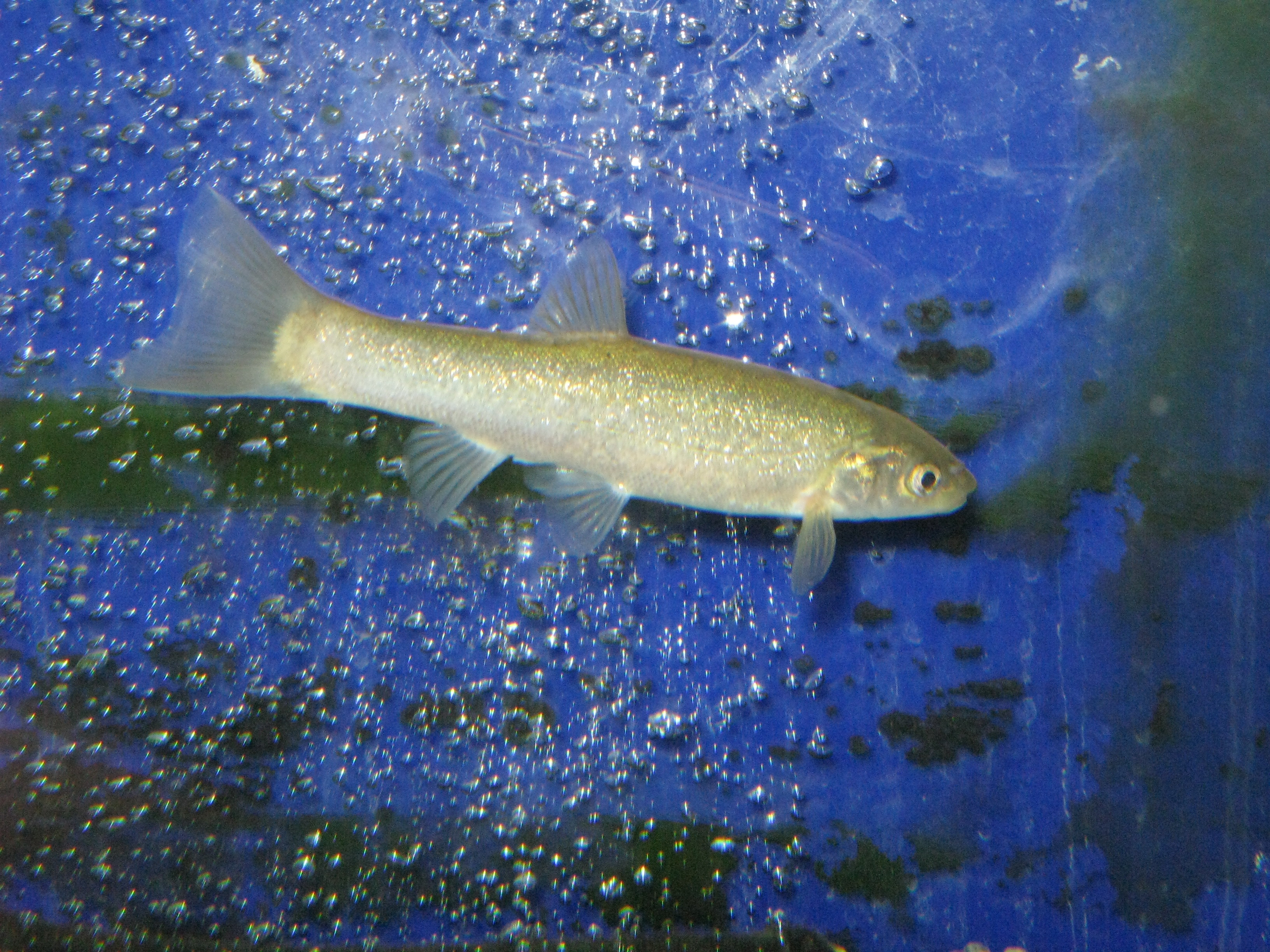

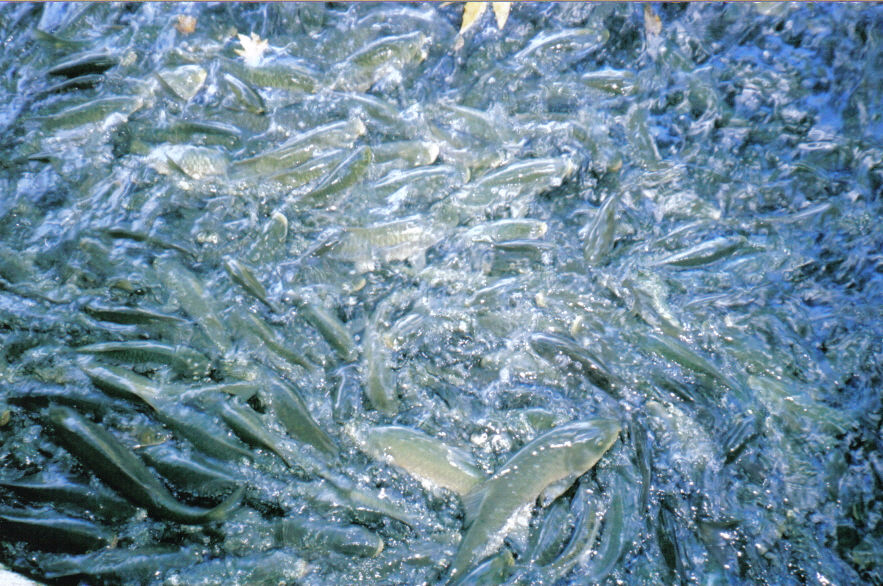

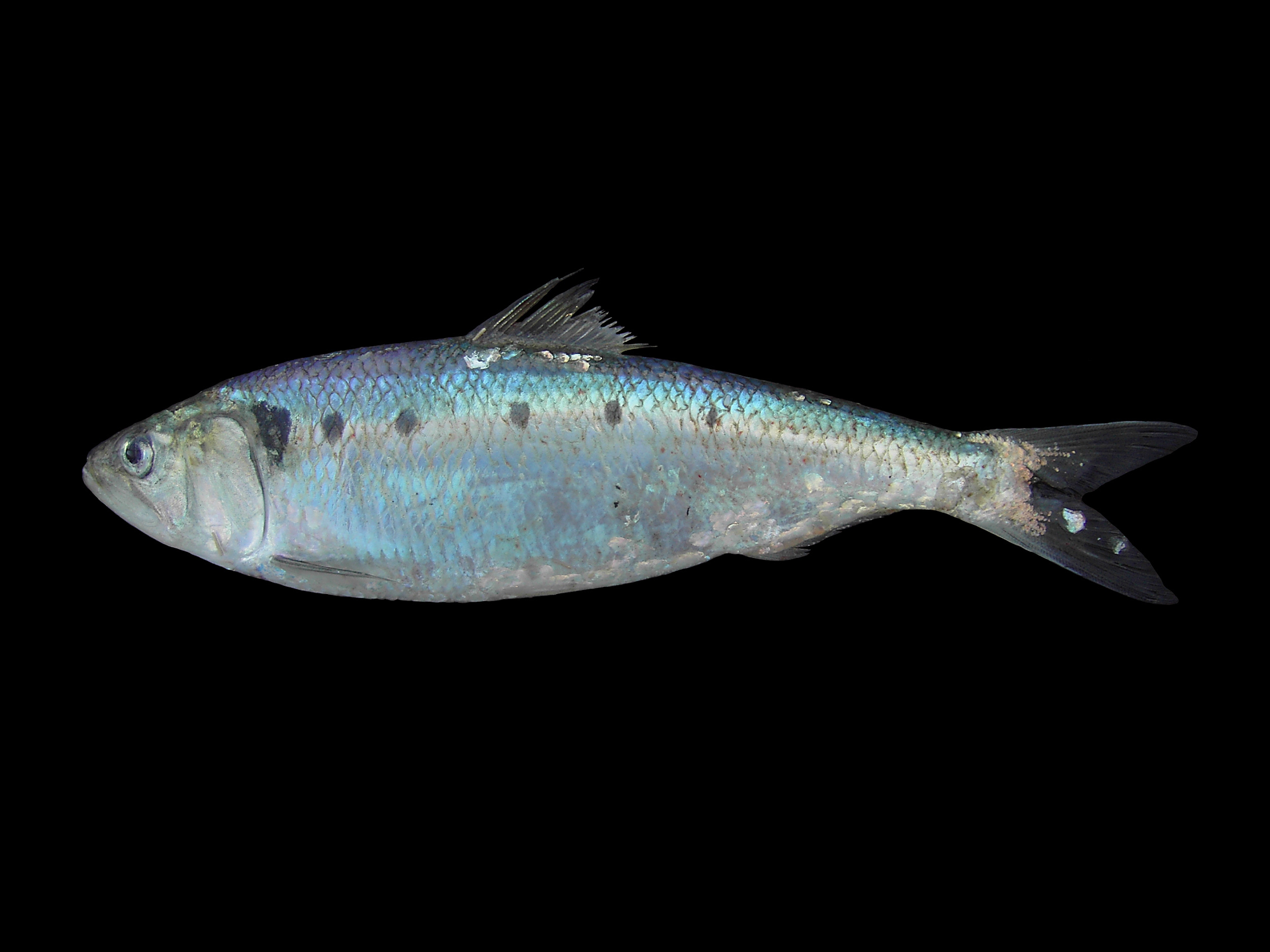

Chinese minnow
Swarm of carp
Twaite shad

In the context of human activity, within any fresh or saltwater ecosystem, there will always be both desirable and undesirable fishes, and this varies from country to country, and often from region to region within a country. Sport fishermen divide freshwater predators of forage fish into those:

- which have a good fighting ability and are good to eat, called sport (or game) fish.
- the other less desirable fish, called rough fish in North America and coarse fish in Britain

Rough or coarse fish usually refers to fish that are not commonly eaten, not sought after for sporting reasons, or have become invasive species reducing the populations of desirable fish. They compete for forage fish with the more popular sport fish. They are often regarded as a nuisance, and are not usually protected by game laws. Forage fish generally are not considered rough or coarse fish because of their usefulness as bait.

The term rough fish is used by U.S. state agencies and anglers to describe undesirable predator fish. In North America, anglers fish for salmon, trout, bass, pike, catfish, walleye and muskellunge. The smallest fish are called panfish, because they can fit in a standard cooking pan. Some examples are crappies, rock bass, perch, bluegill and sunfish.

The term coarse fish originated in the United Kingdom in the early 19th century. Prior to that time, recreational fishing was the sport of the gentry, who angled for trout and salmon which they called "game fish". Fish other than game fish were disdained as "coarse fish". These days, "game fish" refers to Salmonids (other than grayling) — that is, salmon, trout and char. Coarse fish are made up mostly of the larger species of Cyprinids (carp, roach, bream) as well as pike, catfish, gar and lamprey. Coarse fish are no longer disdained; indeed, fishing for coarse fish has become a popular pastime.

Freshwater predators of forage fish

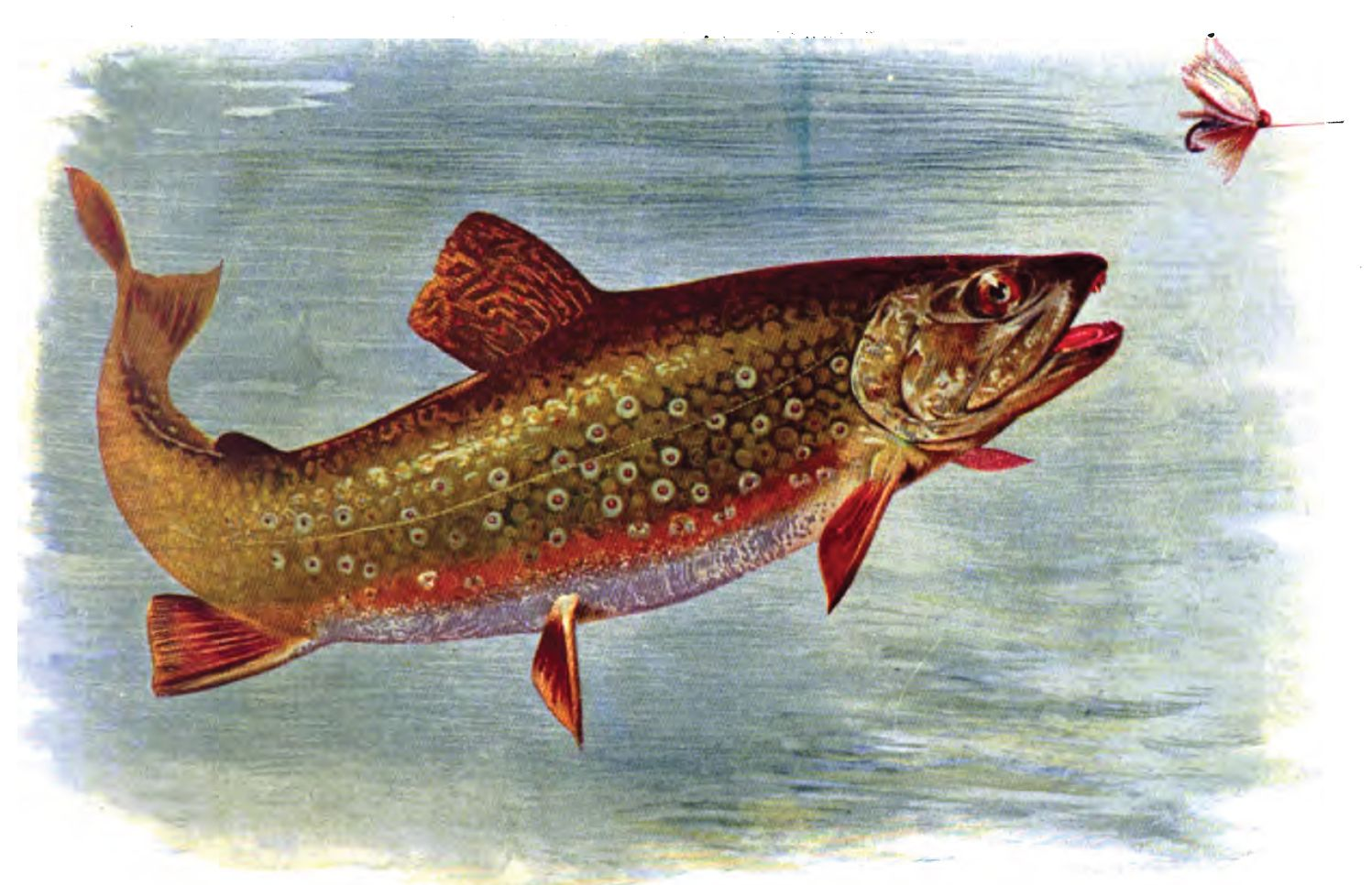

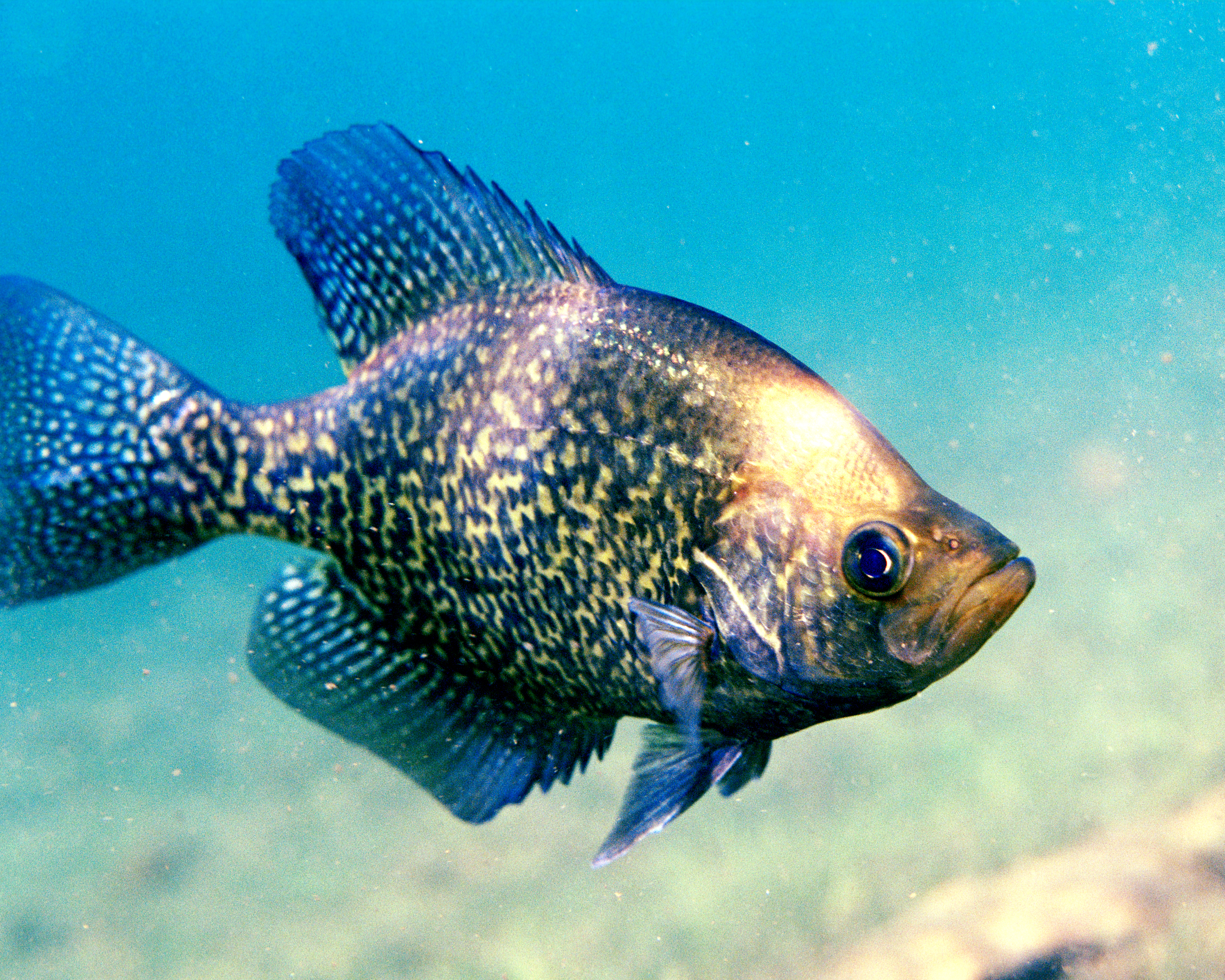

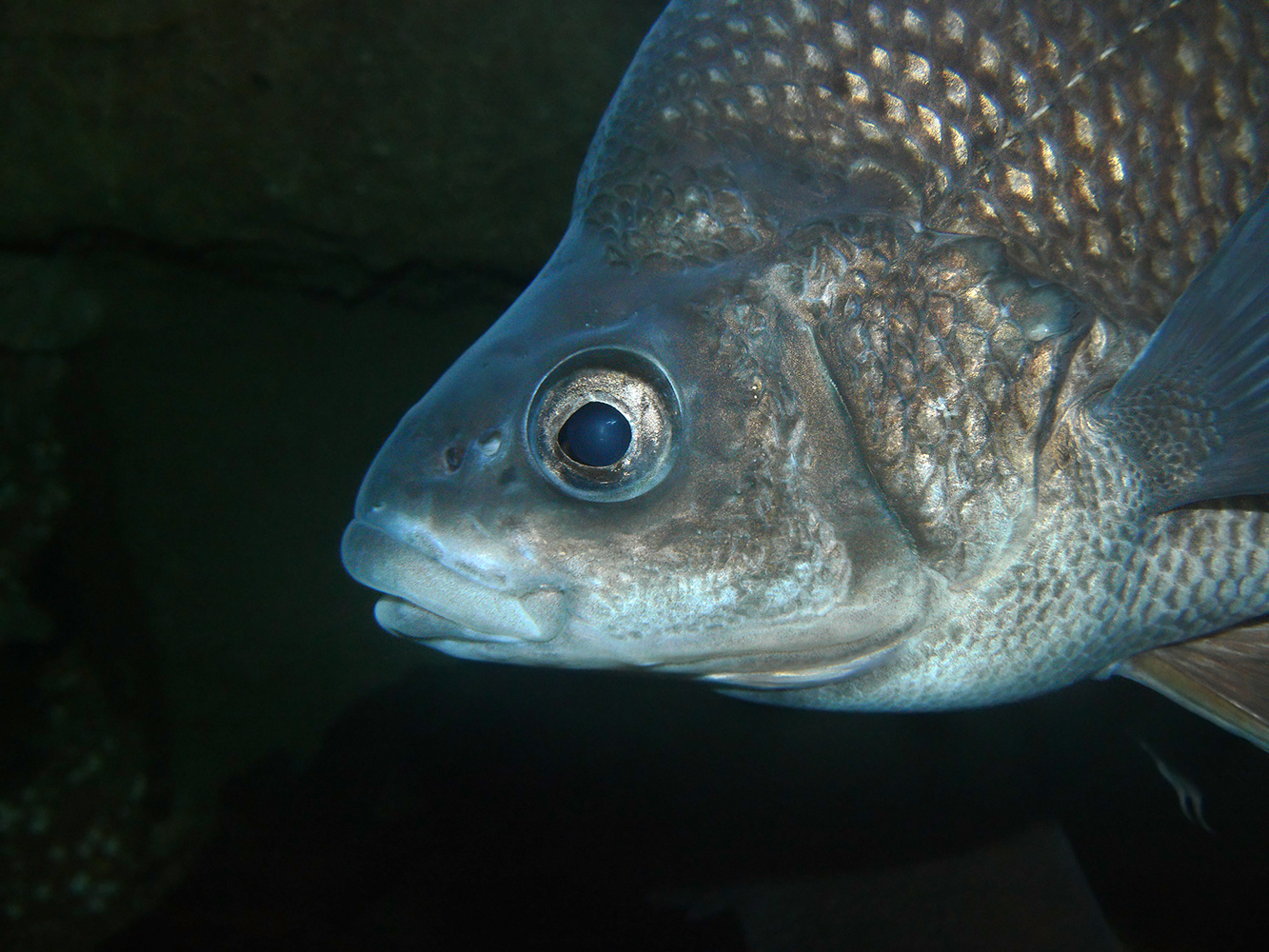

Brook trout
Black crappie
Macquarie perch

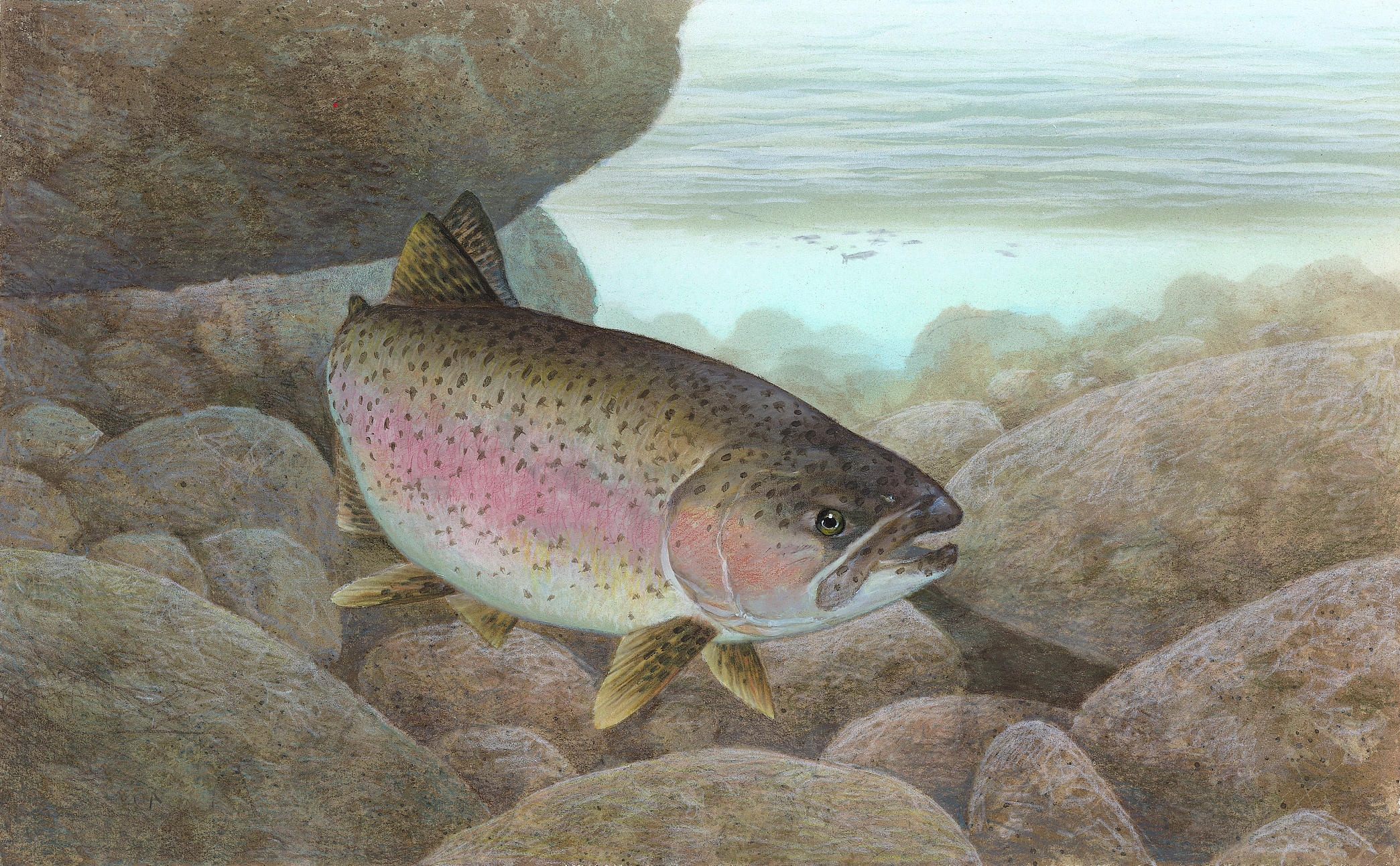

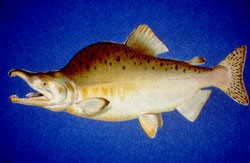

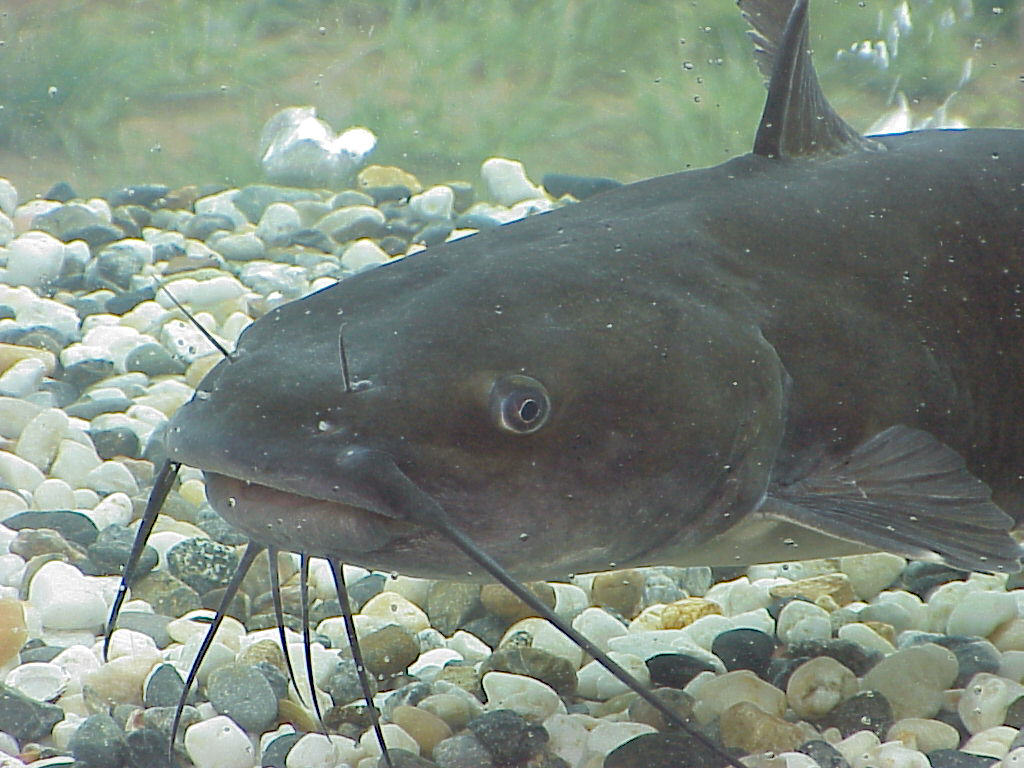

Rainbow trout
Pink salmon
Channel catfish

== Bait and feeder fish ==
Forage fish are sometimes referred to as bait fish or feeder fish. "Forage fish" is a fishing industry term, and is used predominantly in the context of commercial fishing and fisheries science. "Bait fish", by contrast, is a term used mainly by recreational fishermen (particularly anglers) to describe small fish that are caught for the purpose of being used as hookbaits to attract other larger fish, although commercial fishermen may also catch small fish as baits on longlines and traps. The terms overlap in the sense that most bait fish chosen are also forage fish, and conversely most forage fish are suitable for use as baits.

"Feeder fish" is a term used particularly in the context of aquaculture and aquarium fishkeeping, referring to small fish, live or dead, that are presented as foodstuff for larger captive fish. The concept is essentially same as the trophic role of forage fish in the wild, but the term is adapted specifically to feeding fish in aquariums.

== Timeline ==
- 2006: The U.S. National Coalition for Marine Conservation asks U.S. fishery managers to put "Forage First!". Their campaign was launched with the publication of their report, Taking the Bait: Are America’s Fisheries Out-competing Predators for their Prey?, available at cost to the U. S. fishing industry, encouraging fishery managers to protect predator–prey relationships as a first step toward an ecosystem based approach to fishery management.
- 2009: The international Lenfest Forage Fish Task Force is established to develop workable management plans for tackling the depletion of forage fish.
- 2015: sardine populations crashed along the west coast of the United States.

== Recent reports ==
- Pikitch E and 12 others (2012) Little Fish, Big Impact: Managing a Crucial Link in Ocean Food Webs Lenfest Ocean Program, Washington, DC. Summary and other materials available on the Lenfest Ocean Program website.

== See also ==
- Foraging
- Optimal foraging theory
- The Blue Planet
