= NCMC =

NCMC may stand for:

- North Central Michigan College in the state of Michigan, United States of America
- North Central Missouri College in the state of Missouri, United States of America
- National Coalition for Marine Conservation in the United States of America
- National Common Mobility Card in India
- National Crisis Management Centre in New Zealand
