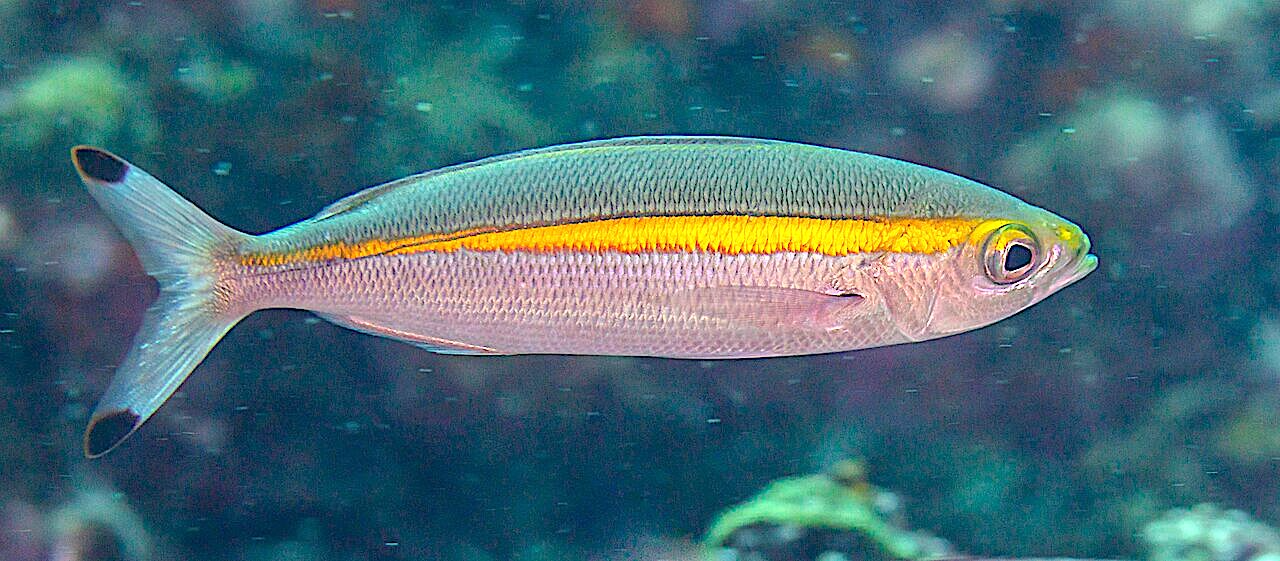
- Goldband fusilier

Conservation status
- Least Concern (IUCN 3.1)

Scientific classification
- Kingdom: Animalia
- Phylum: Chordata
- Class: Actinopterygii
- Order: Acanthuriformes
- Family: Lutjanidae
- Genus: Pterocaesio
- Species: P. chrysozona

Binomial name
- Pterocaesio chrysozona (G. Cuvier, 1830)

Synonyms
- Caesio chrysozona Cuvier, 1830; Pristipomoides aurolineatus Day, 1868

= Goldband fusilier =

Species of fish

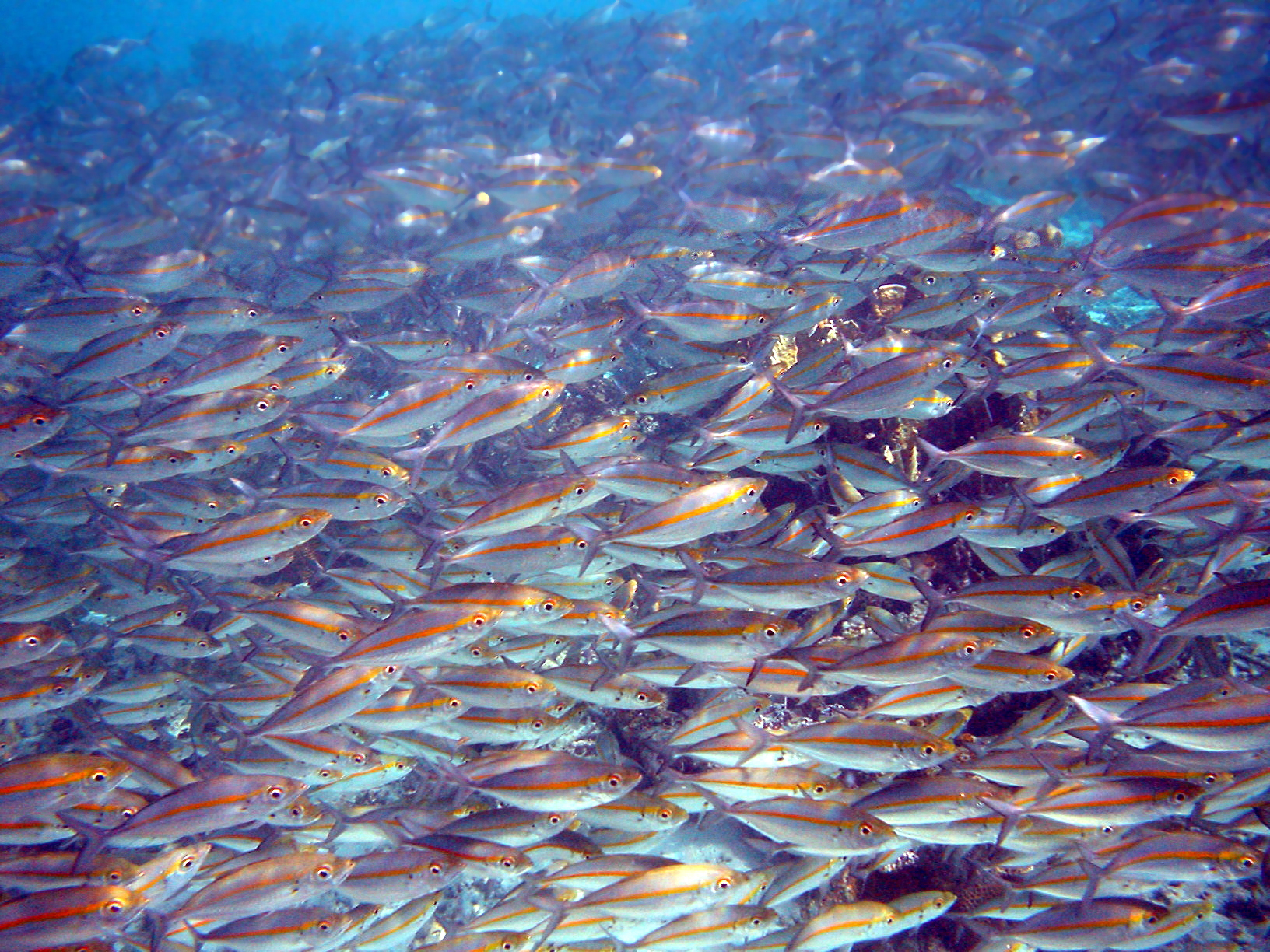
School of Pterocaesio chrysozona in Papua New Guinea

The gold-band fusilier (Pterocaesio chrysozona) also known as the yellow-band fusilier or black-tipped fusilier, is a species of marine ray-finned fish, a fusilier belonging to the family Caesionidae. It is widespread around reefs in the Indo-West Pacific region.

== Taxonomy ==
The goldband fusilier was first formally described as Caesio chryszona in 1830 by the French zoologist Georges Cuvier with the type locality given as "Archipel des Indes", i.e. Indonesia. In his 1987 review of the Caesionidae, Kent E. Carpenter placed this species within the subgenus Pisinnicaesio, of which it is the type species. The specific name chrysozona means "gold band", a reference to the yellow stripe on its flanks.

== Description ==
The goldband fusilier has a fusiform and elongated body which is moderately laterally compressed. There are small conical teeth in the jaws and on the vomer and palatines. The dorsal fin contains 10–11 spines and 14–16 soft rays while the anal fin has 3 spines and 11–13 soft rays. There are scales on both the dorsal and anal fins. There are 17–20 rays in the pectoral fins. This species attains a maximum total length of 21 cm (8.3 in). The overall colour is pale blue to brownish fading to pinkish or white below. There is a wide yellow band along the flanks immediately below the lateral line.

== Distribution and habitat ==
The goldband fusilier is found in the tropical Indian and Western Pacific Oceans. Its range extends along the eastern coast of Africa from Mozambique north to the Red Sea and eastwards across the Indian Ocean, although it is absent from the northern Arabian Sea and the Persian Gulf. In the Pacific Ocean is reaches east as far as the Solomon Islands, north to the Yaeyama Islands and south to Australia. In Australia they are found around the coast from the Dampier Archipelago in Western Australia to Sydney. They are at depths between 5 and 35 m (16 and 115 ft) among coral reefs, seagrass, along outer reef slopes and around pinnacles in deep lagoons.

== Biology ==
Goldband fusiliers are a non-migratory fish, found during the day moving in schools. At night they shelter within the reef. The schools forage for zooplankton in midwater. It is an oviparous species which lays large numbers of small, pelagic eggs.

== Fisheries ==
Goldband fusiliers play a minor role in commercial fisheries. In the Philippines, they are sometimes caught and marketed fresh using traps and drive-in nets. In the Laccadives, the Maldives and the West Pacific, they are used as baitfish for the pole and line tuna fisheries.
