= Wild Oceans (organization) =

US non-profit organization

Wild Oceans, founded in 1973 by fishermen as the National Coalition for Marine Conservation (NCMC), is the United States's oldest public advocacy group dedicated exclusively to conserving ocean fish and their environment. Wild Oceans' mission is to build awareness of the threats to USA marine fisheries and convince policy-makers to restore and protect publicly owned fishery resources. Its efforts focus on stopping overfishing, reducing bykill caused by indiscriminate fishing gear, and stemming the loss of critical marine habitat.

Wild Oceans' five program areas are:

1. Bring Back the Big Fish – restoring and conserving large pelagic fish: (billfish, swordfish, tuna, and sharks),
2. Conserving Marine Ecosystems – expanding traditional single-species management to an ecosystem-based approach, with emphasis on key predator-prey relationships,
3. Fisheries Reform – promoting proactive laws and policies governing the utilization of marine resources,
4. Ahead of the Curve – identifying opportunities to prevent overfishing and advocating precautionary management, and
5. Resources and Education to Conserve Fish – informing and educating the public with the latest information and newest ideas.

The organization maximizes its conservation efforts by teaming up with other groups such as local fishing clubs and national environmental organizations. Wild Oceans has been a leader in efforts to stop shark finning in all US waters; implement longline area closures to reduce the bykill of large pelagic fish; implement a pro-active fishery management plan for dolphin and wahoo; protect sargassum (critical habitat for pelagics) from commercial exploitation; and implement measures to conserve populations of overfished blue and white marlin.

Wild Oceans is funded by private foundations and individual members. Members include conservation-minded fishermen, scientists, divers, boaters, fishing clubs and associations, and wildlife enthusiasts.

== See also ==
- Environmental effects of fishing
- Marine conservation
- Marine ecosystem
