= List of Pokémon episodes (seasons 20–present) =

Pokémon, known in Japan as Pocket Monsters (ポケットモンスター, Poketto Monsutā), is a Japanese anime television series produced by animation studio OLM for TV Tokyo. It is adapted from the Pokémon video game series published by Nintendo. The series originally follows the ten-year-old Pokémon Trainer and aspiring Pokémon Master Ash Ketchum (Note: Ash is voiced in English by Sarah Natochenny from season 9 onwards. His voice actor in Japanese is Rica Matsumoto.) and his adventures with his Electric-type Pokémon partner Pikachu (voiced by Ikue Ōtani), and a varying group of friends. However, by the 26th season, a new cast is featured, with new protagonists Liko and Roy.

For the purposes of this list, the division between seasons of Pokémon is based on the season divisions used by The Pokémon Company International for the English dub. The English episode numbers are based on their first airing either in syndication, on Kids' WB, Cartoon Network, Disney XD or Netflix. Subsequent episodes of the English version follow the original Japanese order, except where banned episodes are shown.

== Series overview ==
Season	Season name	Episodes	Originally released	
Season	Season name	Episodes	First released	Last released
1	Indigo League	80	April 1, 1997	January 21, 1999
2	Adventures in the Orange Islands	36	January 28, 1999	October 7, 1999
3	The Johto Journeys	41	October 14, 1999	July 27, 2000
4	Johto League Champions	52	August 3, 2000	August 2, 2001
5	Master Quest	64	August 9, 2001	November 14, 2002
6	Advanced	40	November 21, 2002	August 28, 2003
7	Advanced Challenge	52	September 4, 2003	September 2, 2004
8	Advanced Battle	52	September 9, 2004	September 29, 2005
9	Battle Frontier	47	October 6, 2005	September 14, 2006
10	Diamond and Pearl	51	September 28, 2006	October 25, 2007
11	Diamond and Pearl: Battle Dimension	52	November 8, 2007	December 4, 2008
12	Diamond and Pearl: Galactic Battles	52	December 4, 2008	December 24, 2009
13	Diamond and Pearl: Sinnoh League Victors	34	January 7, 2010	September 9, 2010
14	Black & White	48	September 23, 2010	September 15, 2011
15	Black & White: Rival Destinies	49	September 22, 2011	October 4, 2012
16	Black & White: Adventures in Unova and Beyond	45	October 11, 2012	September 26, 2013
17	XY	48	October 17, 2013	October 30, 2014
18	XY: Kalos Quest	45	November 13, 2014	October 22, 2015
19	XYZ	48	October 29, 2015	October 27, 2016
20	Sun & Moon	43	November 17, 2016	September 21, 2017
21	Sun & Moon: Ultra Adventures	48	October 5, 2017	October 14, 2018
22	Sun & Moon: Ultra Legends	54	October 21, 2018	November 3, 2019
23	Journeys	48	November 17, 2019	December 4, 2020
24	Master Journeys	42	December 11, 2020	December 10, 2021
25	Ultimate Journeys	54	December 17, 2021	March 24, 2023
26	Horizons	45	April 14, 2023	March 29, 2024
27	Horizons – The Search for Laqua	44	April 12, 2024	March 21, 2025
28	Horizons – Rising Hope	47	April 11, 2025	May 1, 2026
29	Horizons – Wonders Ahead	15	May 22, 2026	TBA

== Episode list ==
=== Season 20: Sun & Moon (2016–17) ===
Jap. overall (Note: The English episode numbers are based on their first airing in the United States on Disney XD. Other English-speaking nations largely follow either this order or the Japanese order.)	Eng. overall	No. in season	English title Japanese title	Original release date	English air date
942	936	1	"Alola to New Adventure!" (Alola! New Islands, New Pokémon!!); Transliteration: "Arōra! Hajimete no shima, hajimete no Pokemon-tachi!!" (Japanese: アローラ! はじめての島、はじめてのポケモンたち!!)	November 17, 2016	December 5, 2016; February 11, 2017; March 17, 2017; May 12, 2017 (Note: These episodes were broadcast in the United States on December 5, 2016, as a sneak peek at the upcoming season, which had recently begun being broadcast in Japan. Previous sequences were broadcast on March 17, 2017.)
943	937	2	"The Guardian's Challenge!" (Enter the Guardian Deity Kapu-Kokeko! Let Us Attempt to Master Our Z-Move!!); Transliteration: "Mamorigami Kapu Kokeko tōjō! Chōsen, ore-tachi no Z-waza!!" (Japanese: 守り神カプ・コケコ登場! 挑戦、オレたちのZワザ!!)	November 17, 2016	December 5, 2016; February 11, 2017; March 17, 2017; May 12, 2017
944	938	3	"Loading the Dex!" (Good Rotomorning, I Am the Rotom Zukan Roto!); Transliteration: "Yorotoshiku, boku, Rotomu Zukan roto" (Japanese: よロトしく、ボク、ロトム図鑑ロト!)	November 24, 2016	May 13, 2017
945	939	4	"First Catch in Alola, Ketchum-style!" (Enter Mokuroh! I Got a Pokémon in Alola!!); Transliteration: "Mokurō tōjō! Arōra de Pokemon getto da ze" (Japanese: モクロー登場! アローラでポケモンゲットだぜ!!)	November 24, 2016	May 14, 2017
946	940	5	"Yo, Ho, Ho! Go, Popplio!" (Ashimari, Do Your Balloonest!); Transliteration: "Ashimari, ganbarūn!" (Japanese: シマリ、がんバルーン!)	December 1, 2016	May 15, 2017
947	941	6	"A Shocking Grocery Run!" (Zing Zap Togedemaru!); Transliteration: "Biribiri chikuchiku Togedemaru!" (Japanese: びりびりちくちくトゲデマル!)	December 8, 2016	May 16, 2017
948	942	7	"That's Why the Litten Is a Scamp!" (Nyabby, The Marketplace Wanderer!); Transliteration: "Ichiba no fūraibō Nyabī!" (Japanese: 市場の風来坊ニャビー!)	December 15, 2016	May 17, 2017
949	943	8	"Lillie's Egg-xhilarating Challenge!" (Who's in Charge of the Egg?); Transliteration: "Tamago-gakari wa dāre da?" (Japanese: タマゴ係はだ～れだ?)	December 22, 2016	May 18, 2017
950	944	9	"To Top a Totem!" (The Leader Pokémon Is Dekagoos!); Transliteration: "Nushi Pokemon wa Dekagūsu!" (Japanese: ぬしポケモンはデカグース!)	January 5, 2017	May 19, 2017
951	945	10	"Trial and Tribulation!" (Will the Z-Move Work?! Challenging the Grand Trial!!); Transliteration: "Deru ka Z-waza! Daishiren e no chōsen!!" (Japanese: 出るかZワザ! 大試練への挑戦!!)	January 12, 2017	May 20, 2017
952	946	11	"Young Kiawe Had a Farm!" (Satoshi Visits Kaki!); Transliteration: "Satoshi, kaki n chi ni iku!" (Japanese: サトシ、カキんちに行く!)	January 19, 2017	May 27, 2017
953	947	12	"The Sun, the Scare, the Secret Lair!" (The Extracurricular Lesson is on Hidoide?!); Transliteration: "Kagai jugyō wa Hidoide!?" (Japanese: 課外授業はヒドイデ!?)	January 26, 2017	June 3, 2017
954	948	13	"Racing to a Big Event!" (The Great Alola Pancake Race!); Transliteration: "Arōra Pankēki dai rēsu!" (Japanese: アローラパンケーキ大レース!)	February 2, 2017	June 10, 2017
955	949	14	"Getting to Know You!" (The Fruit of Courage: Lilie and Rokon!); Transliteration: "Yūki no kesshō, Rīrie to Rokon!" (Japanese: 勇気の結晶、リーリエとロコン!)	February 9, 2017	June 17, 2017
956	950	15	"Rocking Clawmark Hill!" (Scratchmark Hill, Iwanko and Lugarugan!!); Transliteration: "Tsumeato no oka, Iwanko to Rugarugan!!" (Japanese: 爪あとの丘、イワンコとルガルガン!!)	February 23, 2017	June 24, 2017
957	951	16	"They Might Not Be Giants!" (Three Little Pokémon, One Big Adventure!!); Transliteration: "Chiisana san-biki, ōkina bōken!!" (Japanese: 小さな三匹、大きな冒険!!)	March 2, 2017	July 1, 2017
958	952	17	"Crystal-Clear Sleuthing!" (Alola Detective Rotom! The Mystery of the Lost Crystal!!); Transliteration: "Arōra tantei Rotomu! Kieta kurisutaru no nazo!!" (Japanese: アローラ探偵ロトム! 消えたクリスタルの謎!!)	March 9, 2017	July 1, 2017
959	953	18	"A Seasoned Search!" (Really? Mao's Great Culinary Plan!); Transliteration: "Majii!? Mao no oryōri dai sakusen!!" (Japanese: マジィ!? マオのお料理大作戦!!)	March 16, 2017	July 1, 2017
960	954	19	"A Guardian Rematch!" (Intense Electric Shock Training! A Rematch with Kapu-Kokeko!!); Transliteration: "Dengeki mō tokkun! Kapu Kokeko to no saisen!!" (Japanese: 電撃猛特訓! カプ・コケコとの再戦!!)	March 23, 2017	July 1, 2017
961	955	20	"Partner Promises!" (The Promise Between Satoshi and Pikachu); Transliteration: "Satoshi to Pikachū, futari no yakusoku" (Japanese: サトシとピカチュウ、二人の約束)	April 6, 2017	July 1, 2017
962	956	21	"One Journey Ends, Another Begins..." (It's Time for Nyabby to Move On!); Transliteration: "Nyabī, tabidachi no toki!" (Japanese: ニャビー、旅立ちの時!)	April 6, 2017	July 1, 2017
963	957	22	"A Shivering Shovel Search!" (Beware of Shovels!!!); Transliteration: "Sukoppu ni yōchūi!!!" (Japanese: スコップに要注意!!!)	April 13, 2017	July 8, 2017
964	958	23	"Getting the Band Back Together!" (Shocking! A Dugtrio Split-Up?!); Transliteration: "Shōgeki! Dagutorio kaisan?!" (Japanese: 衝撃! ダグトリオ解散!?)	April 20, 2017	July 15, 2017
965	959	24	"Alolan Open House!" (Alola! The First Visitors Day!!); Transliteration: "Arōra! Hajimete no jugyō sankan!!" (Japanese: アローラ! はじめての授業参観!!)	April 27, 2017	July 22, 2017
966	960	25	"A Team-on-Team Tussle!" (The Battle for the Crystal! Rocket Gang VS Skull Gang!!); Transliteration: "Kurisutaru sōdatsu-sen! Roketto-dan tai Sukaru-dan!!" (Japanese: クリスタル争奪戦! ロケット団対スカル団!!)	May 4, 2017	July 29, 2017
967	961	26	"So Long, Sophocles!" (Goodbye, Māmane!); Transliteration: "Sayonara Māmane!" (Japanese: さよならマーマネ!)	May 11, 2017	August 5, 2017
968	962	27	"A Glaring Rivalry!" (Come Forth! The Crimson Glare of Lugarugan!!); Transliteration: "Ide yo! Akaki manazashi Rugarugan!!" (Japanese: 出でよ! 紅き眼差しルガルガン!!)	May 18, 2017	August 19, 2017
969	963	28	"Pulling Out the Pokémon Base Pepper!" (The Fierce Pokébase Match! Go for a Tide-Turning Home Run!!); Transliteration: "Nettō Pokebēsu! Nerae gyakuten hōmuran!!" (Japanese: 熱闘ポケベース! ねらえ逆転ホームラン!!)	May 25, 2017	August 26, 2017
970	964	29	"Lulled to La-La Land!" (Are You Going to Sleep in the Nemashu Forest Too?); Transliteration: "Nemashu no mori de anata mo nemashu?" (Japanese: ネマシュの森であなたも寝ましゅ?)	June 8, 2017	September 2, 2017
971	965	30	"The Ol' Raise and Switch!" (Lilie, Take Good Care of Pikachu); Transliteration: "Rīrie, Pikachū o kawaigatte agete ne" (Japanese: リーリエ、ピカチュウをかわいがってあげてね)	June 15, 2017	September 9, 2017
972	966	31	"The Island Whisperer!" (Lychee Appears! Laugh and Cry, Island Queen!!); Transliteration: "Raichi tōjō! Naitewaratte, shima kuīn!!" (Japanese: ライチ登場! 泣いて笑って、島クイーン!!)	June 22, 2017	September 16, 2017
973	967	32	"Treasure Hunt, Akala Style!" (Finding the Treasure! Mooland Searching!!); Transliteration: "Otakara hakken! Mūrando sāchi!!" (Japanese: お宝発見! ムーランドサーチ!!)	June 29, 2017	September 23, 2017
974	968	33	"Big Sky, Small Fry!" (The Mighty Yowashi, Totem of the Lake!); Transliteration: "Yowashi tsuyoshi, ike no nushi!" (Japanese: ヨワシ強し、池のぬし!)	July 6, 2017	September 30, 2017
975	969	34	"A Crowning Moment of Truth!" (A Fiery Battle! Garagara Appears!!); Transliteration: "Honō no batoru! Garagara arawaru!!" (Japanese: 炎のバトル! ガラガラあらわる!!)	July 20, 2017	October 7, 2017
976	970	35	"Currying Favor and Flavor!" (Curry-ficent Battle! The Lalantes Dance!!); Transliteration: "Karē-na batoru! Rarantesu no mai!!" (Japanese: カレーなバトル! ラランテスの舞!!)	July 27, 2017	October 14, 2017
977	971	36	"Trials and Determinations!" (Lychee's Grand Trial! The Hardest Pokémon Match!!); Transliteration: "Raichi no dai shiren! Ichiban hādona Pokemon shōbu!!" (Japanese: ライチの大試練! 一番ハードなポケモン勝負!!)	August 3, 2017	October 21, 2017
978	972	37	"Rising from the Ruins!" (Iwanko and the Guardian Deity of the Ruins of Life!); Transliteration: "Iwanko to inochi no iseki no mamorigami!" (Japanese: イワンコといのちの遺跡の守り神!)	August 10, 2017	October 28, 2017
979	973	38	"Mimikyu Unmasked!" (Mimikkyu's Disguise!); Transliteration: "Mimikkyu no bake no kawa" (Japanese: ミミッキュのばけのかわ!)	August 17, 2017	November 4, 2017
980	974	39	"Mallow and the Forest Teacher!" (Mao's Runaway from Home and Yareyuutan!); Transliteration: "Iede no Mao to Yareyūtan" (Japanese: 家出のマオとヤレユータン!)	August 24, 2017	November 11, 2017
981	975	40	"Balloons, Brionne, and Belligerence!" (Ashimari, Osyamari, and the Anch-gry Dadarin!); Transliteration: "Ashimari, Oshamari, ikari no Dadarin!" (Japanese: アシマリ、オシャマリ、いかりのダダリン!)	August 31, 2017	November 18, 2017
982	976	41	"Mounting an Electrifying Charge!" (Dash! Dendimushi); Transliteration: "Dasshu! Dendimushi" (Japanese: ダッシュ! デンヂムシ)	September 7, 2017	November 25, 2017
983	977	42	"Alola, Kanto!" (Kanto, Alola! Takeshi and Kasumi!!); Transliteration: "Kantō de Arōra! Takeshi to Kasumi!!" (Japanese: カントーでアローラ! タケシとカスミ!!)	September 14, 2017	November 25, 2017
984	978	43	"When Regions Collide!" (Gym Battle! Z-Move VS Mega Evolution!!); Transliteration: "Jimu batoru! Z-Waza tai Mega Shinka!!" (Japanese: ジムバトル! Zワザ対メガシンカ!!)	September 21, 2017	December 9, 2017

=== Season 21: Sun & Moon - Ultra Adventures (2017–18) ===
Jap. overall (Note: The English episode numbers are based on their first airing in the United States on Disney XD. Other English-speaking nations largely follow either this order or the Japanese order.)	Eng. overall	No. in season	English title Japanese title	Original release date	English air date
985	979	1	"A Dream Encounter!" (Satoshi and Hoshigumo! Strange Meetings!!); Transliteration: "Satoshi to Hoshigumo! Fushigina deai!!" (Japanese: サトシとほしぐも! 不思議な出会い!!)	October 5, 2017	March 24, 2018
986	980	2	"Now You See Them, Now You Don't!" (Hoshigumo Panic! A Sudden Teleport!!); Transliteration: "Hoshigumo panikku! Terepōto wa totsuzen ni!!" (Japanese: ほしぐもパニック! テレポートは突然に!!)	October 12, 2017	March 25, 2018
987	981	3	"Deceiving Appearances!" (The Shapeshifting Metamon, Find that 'Mon!); Transliteration: "Henshin Metamon, sagasundamon!" (Japanese: 変身メタモン、探すんだモン!)	October 19, 2017	March 26, 2018
988	982	4	"A Masked Warning!" (Glazio and Silvady! The Mask of Punishment!!); Transliteration: "Gurajio to Shiruvadi! imashime no kamen!!" (Japanese: グラジオとシルヴァディ! 戒めの仮面!!)	October 26, 2017	March 27, 2018
989	983	5	"Night of a Thousand Poses!" (Full-Force Pose Sleepover!); Transliteration: "Zenryoku pozu deo tomarikai!" (Japanese: ゼンリョクポーズでお泊まり会!)	November 2, 2017	March 28, 2018
990 (Note: This is considered to be the 1,000th episode of Pokémon as recognized by The Pokémon Company in Japan.)	984	6	"Mission: Total Recall!" (Lilie and Silvady, the Resurrected Memory!); Transliteration: "Rīrie to Shiruvadi yomi ga eru kioku!" (Japanese: ゼンリョクポーズでお泊まり会!)	November 9, 2017	March 29, 2018
991	985	7	"Faba's Revenge!" (Sauboh's Counterattack! The Kidnapped Hoshigumo!!); Transliteration: "Zaobo no gyakushu! sarawareta Hoshigumo!" (Japanese: ザオボーの逆襲! さらわれたほしぐも!)	November 16, 2017	March 30, 2018
992	986	8	"Family Determination!" (Effortful Lilie! A Determined Runaway Act!); Transliteration: "Ganba Ririe! Ketsui no iede!" (Japanese: がんばリーリエ! 決意の家出!!)	November 23, 2017	March 31, 2018
993	987	9	"Revealing the Stuff of Legend!" (The Altar of the Sun! Solgaleo Descends!!); Transliteration: "Nichirin no saidan! Sorugareo kōrin!" (Japanese: 日輪の祭壇! ソルガレオ降臨!!)	November 30, 2017	April 7, 2018
994	988	10	"Rescuing the Unwilling!" (Hurry Up! Operation: Rescue Lusamine!!); Transliteration: "Isoge! Ruzamīne kyūshutsu dai sakusen!!" (Japanese: 急げ! ルザミーネ救出大作戦!!)	December 7, 2017	April 14, 2018
995	989	11	"10,000,000 Reasons to Fight!" (Shine, Z-Power Ring! Super Full-Force 10,000,000 Volts!!); Transliteration: "Kagayake Z pawa ringu! cho zenryoku no 1000 man boruto!!" (Japanese: 輝けZパワーリング！超ゼンリョクの1000まんボルト！！)	December 14, 2017	April 21, 2018
996	990 (Note: This is considered to be the 1,000th episode of Pokémon as recognized by The Pokémon Company International.)	12	"The Professors' New Adventure!" (Thank You, Solgaleo! You are Our Hoshigumo!!); Transliteration: "Arigato Sorugareo! oretachi no Hoshigumo!!" (Japanese: ありがとうソルガレオ！俺たちのほしぐも！！)	December 21, 2017	April 28, 2018
997	991	13	"Let Sleeping Pokémon Lie!" (The Strong Sleeper, Nekkoala's Secret!); Transliteration: "Neru ko wa tsuyoi, nekkoala no himitsu!" (Japanese: 寝る子は強い、ネッコアラの秘密！)	December 28, 2017	May 5, 2018
998	992	14	"The Dex Can't Help It!" (Rotom, Can't Stop the Form Change!); Transliteration: "Rotomu, Forumu Chenji Ga Tomaranai!" (Japanese: ロトム、フォルムチェンジが止まらない！)	January 11, 2018	May 12, 2018
999	993	15	"Fighting Back The Tears!" (Don't Cry, Hidoide!); Transliteration: "Nakanaide Hidoide!" (Japanese: 泣かないでヒドイデ！)	January 18, 2018	May 19, 2018
1000	994	16	"Tasting the Bitter With The Sweet!" (Mao and Suiren: Bittersweet Memories!); Transliteration: "Mao soshite Suiren : Amai omoide!" (Japanese: マオそしてスイレン: 甘い思い出!)	January 25, 2018	July 2, 2018
1001	995	17	"Getting A Jump On The Competition!" (Lilie is Soaring Through the Air! The PokéSled Jump Tournament!); Transliteration: "kūki o tsukinuketeimasu ！ pokeddojanputōnamento ！" (Japanese: 空気を突き抜けています！ ポケッドジャンプトーナメント！)	February 1, 2018	July 9, 2018
1002	996	18	"A Mission of Ultra Urgency!" (Set Off! You Are Our Ultra Guardians!); Transliteration: "shuppatsu suru! anata wa watashitachi no urutora gadiandesu!" (Japanese: 出発する！あなたは私たちのウルトラガーディアンです！)	February 8, 2018	July 16, 2018
1003	997	19	"Acting True to Form!" (The Evil Nyarth is an Alolan Nyarth!?); Transliteration: "aku no nyasu wa arora nyasu!?" (Japanese: 悪のニャースはアローラニャース！？)	February 15, 2018	July 23, 2018
1004	998	20	"Pushing the Fiery Envelope!" (Blaze, Nyabby! Overthrow Gaogaen!!); Transliteration: "moeagare nyabby! dato gaogaen!!" (Japanese: 燃え上がれニャビー！打倒ガオガエン！！)	February 22, 2018	July 30, 2018
1005	— (Note: This episode was pulled from rotation in international broadcasts due to a scene in which Ash wears dark face paint supposedly resembling blackface in order to imitate the appearance of a Passimian.)	21	"Satoshi and Nagetukesaru! A Touchdown of Friendship!!"; Transliteration: "Satoshi to Nagetsukesaru! Yujo no Tacchidaun!!" (Japanese: サトシとナゲツケサル！友情のタッチダウン！！)	March 1, 2018	Unaired
1006	999	22	"Turning Heads and Training Hard!" (Ilima and Eievui Make Their Entrance!!); Transliteration: "Irima to ibui ma irima su!!" (Japanese: イリマとイーブイまイリマす！！)	March 8, 2018	August 6, 2018
1007	1000	23	"Smashing with Sketch!" (Smash with Sketch! The Fierce Poké-Ping Pong!!); Transliteration: "Sukecchi de sumasshu! gekito pokepinpon!" (Japanese: スケッチでスマッシュ！激闘ポケピンポン!)	March 15, 2018	August 13, 2018
1008	1001	24	"Love at First Twirl!" (The Lover of Light! Bevenom Spins Round and Round!!); Transliteration: "Pikapika dai suki! kurukuru bebenomu!!" (Japanese: ピカピカだいすき！くるくるベベノム!!)	March 22, 2018	August 25, 2018
1009	1002	25	"Real Life...Inquire Within!" (Work Experience! 24-Hour Pokémon Center!!); Transliteration: "O shigoto taiken! pokemonsenta 24 ji!" (Japanese: お仕事体験！ポケモンセンター24時!!)	April 5, 2018	September 1, 2018
1010	1003	26	"Rise and Shine, Starship!" (The Shining Starship Tekkaguya!); Transliteration: "Kagayake hoshi fune tekkaguya!" (Japanese: 輝け星舟テッカグヤ!)	April 12, 2018	September 8, 2018
1011	1004	27	"The Young Flame Strikes Back!" (Protect the Ranch! The Blue Flame's Counterattack!!); Transliteration: "Bokujo o mamore gyakushu no aoki hono!!" (Japanese: 牧場を守れ！逆襲の蒼き炎!!)	April 19, 2018	September 15, 2018
1012	1005	28	"Dewpider Ascending!" (Shizukumo, Get Suiren!); Transliteration: "Shizukumo, daze!" (Japanese: シズクモ、スイレンゲットだぜ!)	April 26, 2018	September 22, 2018
1013	1006	29	"Sours for the Sweet!" (Ta-ta-ta-dah! Fire it Up, Mao's Family!!); Transliteration: "Panpakapan! Moeyo mao famiri!!" (Japanese: パンパカパーン！燃えよマオファミリー！！)	April 26, 2018	September 29, 2018
1014	1007	30	"Why Not Give Me a Z-Ring Sometime?" (Rocket-dan's Island-Visiting!? Get the Z-Ring!!); Transliteration: "Rokettodan no shima meguri!? Z ringu o getto seyo!!" (Japanese: ロケット団の島めぐり！？Zリングをゲットせよ！！)	May 3, 2018	October 6, 2018
1015	1008	31	"Tough Guy Trials!" (The Super Mean Old Man is an Island King!?); Transliteration: "Cho waru oyaji wa shima kingu!?" (Japanese: ちょーワルおやじはしまキング！？)	May 10, 2018	October 13, 2018
1016	1009	32	"Some Kind of Laziness!" (Kapu-Bulul! Intense Lazy Training!!); Transliteration: "Kapu-Bururu! Gu tara mō tokkun!!" (Japanese: カプ・ブルル！ぐーたらモー特訓！！)	May 17, 2018	October 20, 2018
1017	1010	33	"A Battle Hand-Off!" (Super Decisive Battle! Pikachu VS Mimikkyu!!); Transliteration: "Sūpā kessen! Pikachū VS Mimikkyu!!" (Japanese: スーパー決戦！ピカチュウVSミミッキュ！！)	May 24, 2018	October 27, 2018
1018	1011	34	"Guiding an Awakening!" (Kuchinashi's Grand Trial! Lugarugan Awakens!!); Transliteration: "Kuchinashi no dai shiren! Lugarugan kakusei!!" (Japanese: クチナシの大試練！ルガルガン覚醒！！)	May 31, 2018	November 3, 2018
1019	1012	35	"Twirling with a Bang!" (Ultra Beast Clash! The Great Rumble Crash Operation!!); Transliteration: "Gekitotsu urutorabīsuto! Dondonbachibachi dai sakusen!!" (Japanese: 激激突ウルトラビースト！ドンドンバチバチ大作戦！！)	June 7, 2018	November 10, 2018
1020	1013	36	"Showering the World with Love!" (Minior and Poipole, the Promise that Disappeared into the Starry Sky!); Transliteration: "Meteno to bevenom, hoshizora ni kieta yakusoku!" (Japanese: メテノとベベノム、星空に消えた約束！)	June 14, 2018	November 17, 2018
1021	1014	37	"Not Caving Under Pressure!" (Sandshrew's Storm! Ice Cave Double Battle!!); Transliteration: "Sando no arashi! Kori ana no daburu batoru!!" (Japanese: サンドの嵐！氷穴のダブルバトル！！)	June 28, 2018	November 24, 2018
1022	1015	38	"A Young Royal Flame Ignites!" (Alola's Young Fire! The Birth of Royal Satoshi!!); Transliteration: "Arora no wakaki hono! Roiyaru Satoshi tanjo!!" (Japanese: アローラの若き炎！ロイヤルサトシ誕生！！)	July 5, 2018	December 1, 2018
1023	1016	39	"All They Want to Do is Dance Dance!" (Dance Dance in Evolution?); Transliteration: "Dansu dansu de shinka sen ka?" (Japanese: ダンスダンスで進化せんか？)	July 19, 2018	December 8, 2018
1024	1017	40	"Dummy, You Shrunk the Kids!" (Satoshi, Becomes Small); Transliteration: "Satoshi, chīsaku naru" (Japanese: サトシ、ちいさくなる)	July 26, 2018	December 15, 2018
1025	1018	41	"The Shape of Love to Come!" (The Shape of Family, Bevenom's Feelings!); Transliteration: "Kazoku no katachi, bebenomu no kimochi!" (Japanese: 家族のカタチ、ベベノムのキモチ！)	August 2, 2018	December 22, 2018
1026	1019	42	"The Long Vault Home!" (Leap and Climb, Tundetunde!); Transliteration: "Toned no botte, Tundetunde!" (Japanese: トンデノボッテ、ツンデツンデ！)	August 9, 2018	December 29, 2018
1027	1020	43	"I Choose Paradise!" (I Choose Here! Pokémon Hot Spring Paradise!!); Transliteration: "Koko ni kimeta! Pokemon yukemuri paradaisu!!" (Japanese: ココにきめた！ポケモン湯けむりパラダイス！！)	August 16, 2018	January 12, 2019
1028	1021	44	"Filling the Light with Darkness!" (Alola's Crisis! The Darkness that Eats Radiance!!); Transliteration: "Arōra no kiki! Kagayaki o kurau yami!!" (Japanese: アローラの危機！かがやきを喰らう闇！！)	August 23, 2018	January 19, 2019
1029	1022	45	"Full Moon and Many Arms!" (Lunala VS UB:BLACK! A Full Moon Battle!!); Transliteration: "Runaāra tai UB: Burakku! Mangetsu no tatakai!!" (Japanese: ルナアーラ対UB:BLACK！満月の戦い！！)	August 30, 2018	January 26, 2019
1030	1023	46	"The Prism Between Light and Darkness!" (Prism of Light and Darkness, Its Name is Necrozma!!); Transliteration: "Hikari to yami no purizumu, sononaha nekurozuma!!" (Japanese: 光と闇のプリズム、その名はネクロズマ！！)	September 6, 2018	February 2, 2019
1031	1024	47	"Securing the Future!" (Connect to the Future! The Legend of the Radiant One!); Transliteration: "Mirai e tsunage! Kagayaki-sama no densetsu!!" (Japanese: 未来へつなげ！かがやきさまの伝説！！)	September 13, 2018	February 9, 2019
1032	1025	48	"A Plethora of Pikachu!" (It's a Pikachu Outbreak! The Pikachu Valley!!); Transliteration: "Tairyō hassei-chū! Pikachū nota ni!!" (Japanese: 大量発生チュウ！ピカチュウのたに！！)	October 7, 2018	February 16, 2019
1033	1026	49	"Turning the Other Mask!" (Kukui's Desperate Situation! Another Royal Mask!!); Transliteration: "Kukui zettaizetsumei! Mōhitori no roiyarumasuku!!" (Japanese: ククイ絶体絶命！もう一人のロイヤルマスク！！)	October 14, 2018	February 23, 2019

=== Season 22: Sun & Moon - Ultra Legends (2018–19) ===
Jap. overall (Note: The English episode numbers are based on their first airing in the United States on Disney XD. Other English-speaking nations largely follow either this order or the Japanese order.)	Eng. overall	No. in season	English title Japanese title	Original release date	English air date
1034	1027	1	"Lillier and the Staff!" (The Hero Lilliel and the Alolan Cane!); Transliteration: "Yūsha ririeru to arōra no tsue!" (Japanese: 勇者リリエルとアローラの杖！)	October 21, 2018	March 23, 2019
1035	1028	2	"A Haunted House for Everyone!" (Ghost Pokémon Everywhere! Everyone's Haunted House!!); Transliteration: "Gōsutopokemon dai shūgō! Min'na no obakeyashi!" (Japanese: ゴーストポケモン大集合！みんなのお化け屋敷！)	October 28, 2018	March 24, 2019
1036	1029	3	"Sparking Confusion!" (Wela Volcano: Golone, Golonya and the Hikers!); Transliteration: "Vu~era kazan, gorōngorōnya ya ma o toko!" (Japanese: ヴェラ火山、ゴローンゴローニャやまおとこ！)	November 4, 2018	March 25, 2019
1037	1030	4	"Don't Ignore the Small Stufful!" (Rocket-Dan and Nuikoguma!); Transliteration: "Roketto-dan to nuikoguma!" (Japanese: ロケット団とヌイコグマ！)	November 11, 2018	March 26, 2019
1038	1031	5	"No Stone Unturned!" (Fukuthrow the Master!!! Mokuroh the Sleeperzzz); Transliteration: "Takumi no fukusurō! ! ! Nemuri no mokurō zzz" (Japanese: 匠のフクスロー！！眠りのモクローzzz)	November 18, 2018	March 27, 2019
1039	1032	6	"Bright Lights, Big Changes!" (The Duo Splits Up!? Satoshi and Rotom); Transliteration: "Konbi kaisan! ? Satoshi to rotomu" (Japanese: コンビ解散！？サトシとロトム)	November 25, 2018	March 28, 2019
1040	1033	7	"We Know Where You're Going, Eevee!" (Where is Eievui Going? To the End of the World for the Sake of a Meeting!); Transliteration: "Ībui doko iku no? Ano ko ni ai ni doko made mo!" (Japanese: イーブイどこいくの？あのコに会いにどこまでも)	December 2, 2018	March 29, 2019
1041	1034	8	"Battling the Beast Within!" (The Lightning that Blocks Wind! Its name is Zeraora!!); Transliteration: "Kaze o tatsu inazuma! Sononaha zeraora! !" (Japanese: 風を断つ稲妻！その名はゼラオラ！！)	December 9, 2018	March 30, 2019
1042	1035	9	"Parallel Friendships!" (Fire it Off! The Twin Gigavolt Havoc of Friendship!!); Transliteration: "Hanate! Yūjō no tsuinsupākingugigaboruto! !" (Japanese: 放て！友情のツインスパーキングギガボルト！！)	December 16, 2018	April 6, 2019
1043	1036	10	"Alola, Alola!" (An Alola in Alola! Takeshi and Kasumi!); Transliteration: "Arōra de arōra! Takeshi to Kasumi!" (Japanese: アローラでアローラ！ タケシとカスミ！)	December 23, 2018	April 20, 2019
1044	1037	11	"Heart of Fire! Heart of Stone!" (A Passionate Heart That Smashes Even Rocks! Lychee and Takeshi!!); Transliteration: "Iwa o mo kudaku atsuki hāto! Raichi to Takeshi! !" (Japanese: 岩をも砕く熱きハート！ライチとタケシ！！)	January 6, 2019	April 27, 2019
1045	1038	12	"That's Some Spicy Island Research!" (Poni Island Research Project! Search for the Island King!!); Transliteration: "Poni shima no jiyukenkyū! Shima kingu o sagase! !" (Japanese: ポニ島の自由研究！しまキングをさがせ！！)	January 13, 2019	May 4, 2019
1046	1039	13	"Showdown on Poni Island!" (Decisive Lugarugan Battle! Satoshi VS Glazio!!); Transliteration: "Rugarugan kessen! Satoshi VS Gurajio! !" (Japanese: ルガルガン決戦！サトシVSグラジオ！！)	January 20, 2019	May 11, 2019
1047	1040	14	"Evolving Research!" (We Have a Sea and We Have a Valley! Great Intensive Pokémon Evolution Training!!); Transliteration: "Umi ari tani ari! Pokemon shinka dai tokkun! !" (Japanese: 海あり谷あり！ポケモン進化大特訓！！)	January 27, 2019	June 1, 2019
1048	1041	15	"Run, Heroes, Run!" (Run Kaki! Surpass Yourself!!); Transliteration: "Hashire kaki! Onore o koete! !" (Japanese: 走れカキ！己を超えて！！)	February 3, 2019	June 8, 2019
1049	1042	16	"Memories in the Mist!" (Inside Kapu-Rehire's Mist); Transliteration: "Kapu-Rehire no kirinonakade" (Japanese: カプ・レヒレの霧の中で)	February 10, 2019	June 15, 2019
1050	1043	17	"A Grand Debut!" (The Birth of an Island Queen! Satoshi's Grand Trial!!); Transliteration: "Shima kuīn tanjō! Satoshi no dai shiren! !" (Japanese: しまクイーン誕生！サトシの大試練！！)	February 17, 2019	June 22, 2019
1051	1044	18	"Keeping Your Eyes on the Ball!" (Hole in One at PokéGolf!); Transliteration: "Pokegorufu de ōruinwan" (Japanese: ポケゴルフでホールインワン！)	February 24, 2019	June 29, 2019
1052	1045	19	"Show Me the Metal!" (Arrival in Alola! Dripping Metal Panic!!); Transliteration: "Arōra jōriku! Tarutarumetarupanikku! !" (Japanese: アローラ上陸！タルタルメタルパニック！！)	March 3, 2019	July 6, 2019
1053	1046	20	"Got Meltan?" (Discovering a New Species! Get, Meltan!); Transliteration: "Shinshu hakken! Merutan, Gettoda ze! !" (Japanese: 新種発見！メルタン、ゲットだぜ！！)	March 10, 2019	July 13, 2019
1054	1047	21	"This Magik Moment!" (A New Program!? Melody of the Small Koiking); Transliteration: "Shin Bangumi! ? Chīsana Koikingu no Merodi" (Japanese: 新番組！？小さなコイキングのメロディ)	March 17, 2019	July 20, 2019
1055	1048	22	"Beauty is Only Crystal Deep!" (Beauty and Nyarth!); Transliteration: "Byūtī ando Nyarth!" (Japanese: ビューティー・アンド・ニャース！)	March 24, 2019	July 27, 2019
1056	1049	23	"The Dealer of Destruction!" (Emperor of Destruction Guzma!); Transliteration: "Hakai no Teiō Guzuma!" (Japanese: 破壊の帝王グズマ！)	March 31, 2019	August 3, 2019
1057	1050	24	"The Secret Princess!" (Lilie and the Secret Mechanical Princess!); Transliteration: "Rīrie to Himitsu no Kikō Hime!" (Japanese: リーリエと秘密の機巧姫！)	April 7, 2019	August 10, 2019
1058	1051	25	"Drawn with the Wind!" (Shaymin, Meltan, Nagisa! The Lost Explorers!!); Transliteration: "Sheimi, Merutan, Nagisa! Maigo no Tanken-tai! !" (Japanese: シェイミ、メルタン、ナギサ！迷子の探検隊！！)	April 14, 2019	August 17, 2019
1059	1052	26	"Aiming for the Top Floor!" (Aim for the Top Floor! The Explosive Dragon Gym!!); Transliteration: "Saijōkai o Mezase! Bakuon no Doragonjimu! !" (Japanese: 最上階を目指せ！爆音のドラゴンジム！！)	April 21, 2019	August 24, 2019
1060	1053	27	"A High-Speed Awakening!" (Superspeed Kuwagannon! The Awakening of Māmane!!); Transliteration: "Chōsoku no Kuwagannon! Māmane Kakusei! !" (Japanese: 超速のクワガノン！マーマネ覚醒！！)	April 28, 2019	August 31, 2019
1061	1054	28	"The One That Didn't Get Away!" (Suiren Fishes a Kyogre!?); Transliteration: "Suiren Kaiōga wo Tsuru!?" (Japanese: スイレン、カイオーガを釣る！？)	May 5, 2019	September 7, 2019
1062	1055	29	"A Recipe For Success!" (Mao's Valiant Effort! The Forest Pokémon Café!!); Transliteration: "Mao funtō! Mori no pokemon kafe! !" (Japanese: マオ奮闘！森のポケモンカフェ！！)	May 12, 2019	September 14, 2019
1063	1056	30	"Spying For The Big Guy!" (You're Being Watched! Rocket-Dan's Alola Forms!!); Transliteration: "Kanshi shimasu! Roketto-dan arōra no su gata! !" (Japanese: 監視します！ロケット団アローラのすがた！！)	May 19, 2019	September 21, 2019
1064	1057	31	"A Fiery Training Camp Trick!" (Master the Z-Move! Kaki's Fierce Boot Camp!!); Transliteration: "Z Waza o kiwamero! Shakunetsu no kaki gasshuku! !" (Japanese: Zワザを極めろ！灼熱のカキ合宿！！)	May 26, 2019	September 28, 2019
1065	1058	32	"Living on the Cutting Edge!" (Perfect Sharpness! Kamiturugi has Arrived!!); Transliteration: "Kireaji batsugun! Kamiturugi kenzan! !" (Japanese: 切れ味バツグン！カミツルギ見参！！)	June 2, 2019	October 5, 2019
1066	1059	33	"A Timeless Encounter!" (Satoshi, Encounter Beyond Time!); Transliteration: "Satoshi, Toki wo koeta deai!" (Japanese: サトシ、時を超えた出会い！)	June 9, 2019	October 12, 2019
1067	1060	34	"Pikachu's Exciting Adventure!" (Pikachu's Exciting Expedition!); Transliteration: "Pikachū no dokidoki tanken-tai!" (Japanese: ピカチュウのドキドキ探検隊！)	June 16, 2019	October 19, 2019
1068	1061	35	"Chasing Memories, Creating Dreams!" (Gladio & Lillie! Chasing A Father's Phantom!!); Transliteration: "Gurajio to Rīrie! Chichi no gen'ei o otte!!" (Japanese: グラジオとリーリエ！父の幻影を追って！！)	June 23, 2019	October 26, 2019
1069	1062	36	"League Offenders and Defenders!" (The Curtain Rides! Alola Pokémon League!!); Transliteration: "Kaimaku! Arōra Pokemon Rīgu!!" (Japanese: 開幕！アローラポケモンリーグ！！)	June 30, 2019	November 2, 2019
1070	1063	37	"Battle Royal 151!" (Brawl! Battle Royale 151!!); Transliteration: "Dai rantō! Batoru roiyaru 151!!" (Japanese: 大乱闘！バトルロイヤル151！！)	July 7, 2019	November 9, 2019
1071	1064	38	"Battling Besties!" (Mao and Suiren! Super Full-Force Friendship Battle!!); Transliteration: "Mao to Suiren! Yūjō no zenryoku batoru!" (Japanese: マオとスイレン！友情のゼンリョクバトル！)	July 14, 2019	November 16, 2019
1072	1065	39	"The Battlefield of Truth and Love!" (Musashi VS Kojirō! Battlefield of Truth and Love!!); Transliteration: "Musashi VS Kojirō! Ai to shinjitsu no batoru fīrudo!!" (Japanese: ムサシVSコジロウ！愛と真実のバトルフィールド！！)	July 21, 2019	November 23, 2019
1073	1066	40	"Imitation is the Sincerest Form of Strategy!" (Overcome Junaiper!); Transliteration: "Junaipā o kōryaku seyo!" (Japanese: ジュナイパーを攻略せよ！)	July 28, 2019	November 30, 2019
1074	1067	41	"Battling on the Wing!" (A Soaring Showdown! Brave Bird vs. Sky Attack!!); Transliteration: "Tori-jō kessen! Bureibubādo VS goddobādo!!" (Japanese: 鳥上決戦！ブレイブバードVSゴッドバード！！)	August 4, 2019	December 7, 2019
1075	1068	42	"The Road to the Semi-Finals!" (Everybody's Fully Powered! The Road to the Semi-Finals!!); Transliteration: "Min'na zenryoku! Junkesshō e no michi!!" (Japanese: みんなゼンリョク！準決勝への道！！)	August 11, 2019	December 14, 2019
1076	1069	43	"The Final Four!" (The Semi-Finals! Kaki vs. Gladio!!); Transliteration: "Junkesshō! Kaki VS Gurajio!!" (Japanese: 準決勝！カキVSグラジオ！！)	August 18, 2019	December 21, 2019
1077	1070	44	"Getting Down to the Ire!" (Rising Fire! There's More Than One Rival!!); Transliteration: "Moeagaru honō! Raibaru wa hitori janai!!" (Japanese: 燃え上がる炎！ライバルはひとりじゃない！！)	August 25, 2019	December 28, 2019
1078	1071	45	"The Wisdom Not To Run!" (Undefeated Emperor Guzma!!); Transliteration: "Muhai no teiō Guzuma!" (Japanese: 無敗の帝王グズマ！)	September 1, 2019	January 4, 2020
1079	1072	46	"Final Rivals!" (The Finals! Ultimate Rival Showdown!!); Transliteration: "Kesshōsen! Saikyō raibaru taiketsu!!" (Japanese: 決勝戦！最強ライバル対決！！)	September 8, 2019	January 11, 2020
1080	1073	47	"Enter the Champion!" (The Rise of Alola's Champion!!); Transliteration: "Tanjō! Arōra no hasha! !" (Japanese: 誕生！アローラの覇者！！)	September 15, 2019	January 18, 2020
1081	1074	48	"Z-Move Showdown!" (Akuziking Invasion! The Great Z-Move Battle!!); Transliteration: "Akujikingu shūrai! Z-Waza daisakusen! !" (Japanese: アクジキング襲来！Zワザ大決戦！！)	September 22, 2019	January 25, 2020
1082	1075	49	"Exhibition Unmasked!" (Final Battle! Satoshi vs. Kukui!!); Transliteration: "Fainaru batoru! Satoshi tai Kukui! !" (Japanese: ファイナルバトル！サトシ対ククイ！！)	September 29, 2019	February 1, 2020
1083	1076	50	"A Full Battle Bounty!" (Burn! Swell Up! Full Battle!!!); Transliteration: "Moeru! Minagiru! ! Furubatoru! ! !" (Japanese: 燃える！みなぎる！！フルバトル！！！)	October 6, 2019	February 8, 2020
1084	1077	51	"Fiery Surprises!" (Conclusion! Gaogaen vs. Nyaheat!!); Transliteration: "Ketchaku! Gaogaen VS Nyahīto! !" (Japanese: 決着！ガオガエンVSニャヒート！！)	October 13, 2019	February 15, 2020
1085	1078	52	"From Z to Shining Z!" (Alola's Strongest Z! Kapu-Kokeku VS Pikachu!!); Transliteration: "Arōra saikyō no Z! Kapu-kokeko VS Pikachū! !" (Japanese: アローラ最強のZ！カプ・コケコVSピカチュウ！！)	October 20, 2019	February 22, 2020
1086	1079	53	"Dreams of the Sun and Moon!" (The Sun, the Moon, and Everyone's Dreams!); Transliteration: "Taiyō to tsuki to, min'na no yume!" (Japanese: 太陽と月と、みんなの夢)	October 27, 2019	February 29, 2020
1087	1080	54	"Thank You, Alola! The Journey Continues!" (Thank You, Alola! The Start of New Journeys!!); Transliteration: "Arigatou Arora! Sorezore no tabidachi!!" (Japanese: ありがとうアローラ！それぞれの旅立ち！！)	November 3, 2019	March 7, 2020

=== Season 23: Journeys (2019–20) ===
Jap. overall (Note: The English episode numbers are based on their first streaming in the United States on Netflix. Other English-speaking nations largely follow either this order or the Japanese order. Episodes released on Netflix in the U.S. are released on a quarterly basis while those on TV networks outside of the U.S. are aired on a weekly basis.)	Eng. overall	No. in season	English title Japanese title	Original release date	English release date
1088	1081	1	"Enter Pikachu!" (Pikachu is Born!); Transliteration: "Pikachū tanjō!" (Japanese: ピカチュウ誕生！)	November 17, 2019	June 12, 2020
1089	1082	2	"Legend? Go! Friends? Go!" (Satoshi and Gō, Let's Go by Lugia!); Transliteration: "Satoshi to Gō, Rugia de Gō!" (Japanese: サトシとゴウ、ルギアでゴー！)	November 24, 2019	June 12, 2020
1090	1083	3	"Ivysaur's Mysterious Tower!" (Fushigisō, Isn't it Mysterious?); Transliteration: "Fushigisōtte Fushigidane?" (Japanese: フシギソウってフシギだね？)	December 1, 2019	June 12, 2020
1091	1084	4	"Settling the Scorbunny!" (Let's Go to the Galar Region! An Encounter with Hibanny!!); Transliteration: "Ikuze Gararu Chihō! Hibanī Tono Deai!!" (Japanese: 行くぜガラル地方！ヒバニーとの出会い！！)	December 8, 2019	June 12, 2020
1092	1085	5	"Mind-Boggling Dynamax!" (Kabigon Became Gigantic!? The Mystery of Daimax!!); Transliteration: "Kabigon Kyodai ka!? Daimakkusu no Nazo!!" (Japanese: カビゴン巨大化！？ダイマックスの謎！！)	December 15, 2019	June 12, 2020
1093	1086	6	"Working My Way Back to Mew!" (Catch a Lot of Pokémon! The Path to Mew!!); Transliteration: "Pokémon Tairyō Getto Daze! Myū e no Michi!!" (Japanese: ポケモン大量ゲットだぜ！ミュウへの道！！)	December 22, 2019	June 12, 2020
1094	1087	7	"Serving Up the Flute Cup!" (The Hoenn Region, Site of Fierce Fights! The Battle Frontier Challenge!!); Transliteration: "Gekitō no Hōen Chihō! Chōsen Batoru Furontia!!" (Japanese: 激闘のホウエン地方！挑戦バトルフロンティア！！)	December 29, 2019	June 12, 2020
1095	1088	8	"The Sinnoh Iceberg Race!" (Don't Lose, Pochama! The Drift Ice Race in the Sinnoh Region!!); Transliteration: "Makeruna Potchama! Shin'ō Chihō no Ryūhyō Rēsu!!" (Japanese: 負けるなポッチャマ！シンオウ地方の流氷レース！！)	January 12, 2020	June 12, 2020
1096	1089	9	"Finding a Legend!" (The Promise We Made that Day! The Houou Legend of the Johto Region!!); Transliteration: "Ano Hi no Chikai! Jōto Chihō no Hōō Densetsu!!" (Japanese: あの日の誓い！ジョウト地方のホウオウ伝説！！)	January 19, 2020	June 12, 2020
1097	1090	10	"A Test in Paradise!" (The Kairyu Paradise and Hakuryu's Ordeal!); Transliteration: "Kairyū no Rakuen, Hakuryū no Shiren!" (Japanese: カイリューの楽園、ハクリューの試練！)	January 26, 2020	June 12, 2020
1098	1091	11	"Best Friend... Worst Nightmare!" (Koharu, Wanpachi, and Sometimes Gangar Too); Transliteration: "Koharu to Wanpachi to, Tokidoki, Gengā" (Japanese: コハルとワンパチと、時々、ゲンガー)	February 2, 2020	June 12, 2020
1099	1092	12	"Flash of the Titans!" (Daimax Battle! Dande, The Greatest of Them All!!); Transliteration: "Daimakkusu Batoru! Saikyō Ōja Dande!!" (Japanese: ダイマックスバトル！最強王者ダンデ！！)	February 9, 2020	June 12, 2020
1100	1093	13	"The Climb to Be the Very Best!" (Satoshi vs. Dande! The Road to the Strongest!!); Transliteration: "Satoshi tai Dande! Saikyō e no Michi!!" (Japanese: サトシ対ダンデ！最強への道！！)	February 16, 2020	September 11, 2020
1101	1094	14	"Raid Battle in the Ruins!" (First in the Unova Region! The Raid Battle at the Ruins!!); Transliteration: "Hatsu Isshu Chihō! Iseki de Reidobatoru!!" (Japanese: 初イッシュ地方！遺跡でレイドバトル！！)	February 23, 2020	September 11, 2020
1102	1095	15	"A Snow Day for Searching!" (On a Snowy Day, Where Is Karakara's Bone?); Transliteration: "Yuki no Hi, Karakara no Hone wa Doko?" (Japanese: 雪の日、カラカラのホネはどこ？)	March 1, 2020	September 11, 2020
1103	1096	16	"A Chilling Curse!" (Cursed Satoshi...!); Transliteration: "Norowareta Satoshi...!" (Japanese: 呪われたサトシ...！)	March 8, 2020	September 11, 2020
1104	1097	17	"Kicking It From Here Into Tomorrow!" (Hibanny, Use Your Flaming Kick! Face Tomorrow!!); Transliteration: "Hibanī, Honō no Kikku! Asunimukatte!!" (Japanese: ヒバニー、炎のキック！明日に向かって！！)	March 15, 2020	September 11, 2020
1105	1098	18	"Destination: Coronation!" (Satoshi Participates! The Pokémon World Championships!!); Transliteration: "Satoshi Sansen! Pokémon Wārudo Chanpionshippusu! !" (Japanese: サトシ参戦！ポケモンワールドチャンピオンシップス！！)	March 22, 2020	September 11, 2020
1106	1099	19	"A Talent for Imitation!" (I Am Metamon!); Transliteration: "Watashi wa Metamon!" (Japanese: ワタシはメタモン！)	March 29, 2020	September 11, 2020
1107	1100	20	"Dreams Are Made of These!" (Go Towards Your Dream! Satoshi and Go!!); Transliteration: "Yume e Mukatte Gō! Satoshi to Gō!!" (Japanese: 夢へ向かってゴー！サトシとゴウ！！)	April 5, 2020	September 11, 2020
1108	1101	21	"Caring for a Mystery!" (Convey the Wave Guidance! Satoshi and the Mysterious Egg!!); Transliteration: "Todoke-ha Shirube! Satoshi to Fushigina Tamago! !" (Japanese: とどけ波導！サトシと不思議なタマゴ！！)	April 12, 2020	September 11, 2020
1109	1102	22	"Goodbye, Friend!" (Goodbye, Rabbifoot!); Transliteration: "Sayonara, Rabbifuto!" (Japanese: さよなら、ラビフット！)	April 19, 2020	September 11, 2020
1110	1103	23	"Panic in the Park!" (A Massive Panic! Sakuragi Park!); Transliteration: "Dai Panikku! Sakuragi Pāku!" (Japanese: 大パニック！サクラギパーク！！)	June 7, 2020 (Note: This episode was originally scheduled to air on April 26, 2020, and the six following were to air in the subsequent weeks but did not due to the production shutdown caused by the COVID-19 pandemic in Japan.)	September 11, 2020
1111	1104	24	"A Little Rocket R&R!" (Take a Break! Rocket-dan!!); Transliteration: "Yasume! Roketto-dan!!" (Japanese: 休め！ロケット団！！)	June 14, 2020	September 11, 2020
1112	1105	25	"A Festival Reunion!" (A Battle Festival Exploding With Life! VS Mega Lucario!!); Transliteration: "Inochi Bakuhatsu Batoru Fesu! Buiesu Mega Rukario!!" (Japanese: 命爆発バトルフェス！VSメガルカリオ！！)	June 21, 2020	December 4, 2020
1113	1106	26	"Splash, Dash, and Smash for the Crown!" (Jump! Koiking); Transliteration: "Hanero! Koikingu" (Japanese: はねろ！コイキング)	June 28, 2020	December 4, 2020
1113	1106	26	"Slowking's Crowning!" (Put it On! Yadoking); Transliteration: "Kabure! Yadoking" (Japanese: かぶれ！ヤドキング)	June 28, 2020	December 4, 2020
1114	1107	27	"Toughing It Out!" (Legends of Heroes! Dande's Greatest Battle!!); Transliteration: "Hideo Densetsu! Dande Saikyō Batoru!!" (Japanese: 英雄伝説！ダンデ最強バトル！！)	July 5, 2020	December 4, 2020
1115	1108	28	"Sobbing Sobble!" (Sobbing Messon); Transliteration: "Mesomeso Messon" (Japanese: めそめそメッソン)	July 12, 2020	December 4, 2020
1116	1109	29	"There's a New Kid in Town!" (Electrifying Jealousy! Wanpachi's Feelings); Transliteration: "Pachipachi Yaki Mochi! Wanpachi no Kimochi" (Japanese: パチパチやきもち！ワンパチのきもち)	July 19, 2020	December 4, 2020
1117	1110	30	"Betrayed, Bothered, and Beleaguered!" (The Reluctant Pikachu and the Exasperated Barrierd); Transliteration: "Iyaiya Pikachū, Yareyare Bariyādo" (Japanese: いやいやピカチュウ、やれやれバリヤード)	July 26, 2020	December 4, 2020
1118	1111	31	"The Cuteness Quotient!" (Hinbass's Beautiful Scale); Transliteration: "Hinbasu no Kireina Uroko" (Japanese: ヒンバスのきれいなウロコ)	August 2, 2020	December 4, 2020
1119	1112	32	"Time After Time!" (Celebi: A Timeless Promise); Transliteration: "Serebī Toki o Koeta Yakusoku" (Japanese: セレビィ 時を超えた約束)	August 9, 2020	December 4, 2020
1120	1113	33	"Trade, Borrow, and Steal!" (Would You Like To Do a Pokémon Trade?); Transliteration: "Pokemon Kōkan Shimasenka?" (Japanese: ポケモン交換しませんか？)	August 16, 2020	December 4, 2020
1121	1114	34	"Solitary and Menacing!" (The Solitary Fighter Saito! The Threatening Otosupus!!); Transliteration: "Kokō no Tōshi Saitō！Otosupasu no Kyōi! !" (Japanese: 孤高の闘士サイトウ！オトスパスの脅威！！)	August 23, 2020	December 4, 2020
1122	1115	35	"Gotta Catch a What?!" (Pikachu, I'll Get You!!); Transliteration: "Pikachu, Getto Daze!!" (Japanese: ピカチュウ、ゲットだぜ！！)	August 30, 2020	December 4, 2020
1123	1116	36	"Making Battles in the Sand!" (Satoshi and Go, Crawl Up From the Sand Hell!); Transliteration: "Satoshi to Gō, Suna Jigoku Kara Hai Agare" (Japanese: サトシとゴウ、砂地獄から這い上がれ！)	September 6, 2020	December 4, 2020
1124	1117	37	"That New Old Gang of Mine!" (I'm Back! Nice to Meet You, Alola!); Transliteration: "Tadaima！ Hajimemashite, Arōra！" (Japanese: ただいま！はじめましてアローラ！)	September 13, 2020	March 5, 2021
1125	1118	38	"Restore and Renew!" (Miracle Restoration, the Fossil Pokémon!); Transliteration: "Kiseki no Fukugen, Kaseki no Pokemon!" (Japanese: 奇跡の復元、化石のポケモン！)	September 20, 2020	March 5, 2021
1126	1119	39	"Octo-Gridlock at the Gym!" (Satoshi Vs Saito! Conquer the Octopus Hold!!); Transliteration: "Satoshi tai Saitō! Kōryaku Tako ga Tame!!" (Japanese: サトシ対サイトウ！攻略たこがため！！)	September 27, 2020	March 5, 2021
1127	1120	40	"A Crackling Raid Battle!" (VS Thunder! A Legendary Raid Battle!!); Transliteration: "Buiesu Sandā! Densetsu Reido Batoru!!" (Japanese: VSサンダー！伝説レイドバトル！！)	October 9, 2020	March 5, 2021
1128	1121	41	"Pikachu Translation Check..." (The Great Pikachu Dubbing Operation!); Transliteration: "Pikachū Atereko Dai Sakusen!" (Japanese: ピカチュウ アテレコ大作戦！)	October 16, 2020	March 5, 2021
1128	1121	41	"Up To Your Neck!" (Half, Numacraw.); Transliteration: "Hanbun, Numakurō." (Japanese: 半分、ヌマクロー。)	October 16, 2020	March 5, 2021
1129	1122	42	"Sword and Shield, Slumbering Weald!" (Sword & Shield I - "Slumbering Forest"); Transliteration: "Sōdo Ando Shīrudo I "Madoromi no Mori"" (Japanese: ソード&シールドI 「まどろみの森」)	October 23, 2020	March 5, 2021
1130	1123	43	"Sword and Shield: The Darkest Day!" (Sword & Shield II - "Black Night"); Transliteration: "Sōdo Ando Shīrudo II "Burakku Naito"" (Japanese: ソード&シールドII 「ブラックナイト」)	October 30, 2020	March 5, 2021
1131	1124	44	"Sword and Shield: "From Here to Eternatus!"" (Sword & Shield III - "Mugendaina"); Transliteration: "Sōdo Ando Shīrudo III "Mugendaina"" (Japanese: ソード&シールドIII 「ムゲンダイナ」)	November 6, 2020	March 5, 2021
1132	1125	45	"Sword and Shield... The Legends Awaken!" (Sword & Shield IV - "The Ultimate Sword and Shield"); Transliteration: "Sōdo Ando Shīrudo IV "Saikyō no Ken to Tate"" (Japanese: ソード&シールドIV 「最強の剣と盾」)	November 13, 2020	March 5, 2021
1133	1126	46	"Getting More Than You Battled For!" (Battle & Get! The Revival of Mewtwo); Transliteration: "Batoru Ando Getto! Myūtsū no Fukkatsu" (Japanese: バトル&ゲット！ミュウツーの復活)	November 20, 2020	March 5, 2021
1134	1127	47	"Crowning the Chow Crusher!" (Pokémon Champion! Gluttony King Playoff!!); Transliteration: "Pokemon Chanpion! Ōgui-ō Kettei-sen!!" (Japanese: ポケモンチャンピオン！大食い王決定戦！！)	November 27, 2020	March 5, 2021
1135	1128	48	"A Close Call... Practically!" (A Close Call with Practically Pikachu!); Transliteration: "Hobo Hobo Pikachū Kiki Ippatsu!" (Japanese: ほぼほぼピカチュウ危機一髪！)	December 4, 2020	March 5, 2021

=== Season 24: Master Journeys (2020–21) ===
Jap. overall (Note: The English episode numbers are based on their first streaming in the United States on Netflix. Other English-speaking nations largely either follow this order or the Japanese order. Episodes released on Netflix in the U.S. are released quarterly while those on TV networks outside of the U.S. are aired weekly.)	Eng. overall	No. in season	English title Japanese title	Original release date	English release date
1136	1129	1	"To Train, or Not to Train! (Koharu and the Mysterious, Mysterious Eievui!)"; Transliteration: "Koharu to Fushigina Fushigina Ībui!" (Japanese: コハルと不思議な不思議なイーブイ！)	December 11, 2020	September 10, 2021
1137	1130	2	"A Pinch of This, a Pinch of That! (Galar's Fossils! Stick 'em Together!!)"; Transliteration: "Gararu no Kaseki! Gatchanko!!" (Japanese: ガラルの化石！がっちゃんこ！！)	January 8, 2021	September 10, 2021
1138	1131	3	"Trials of a Budding Master! (Kamonegi's Great Trial!)"; Transliteration: "Kamonegi Ōinaru Shiren!" (Japanese: カモネギ大いなる試練！)	January 15, 2021	September 10, 2021
1139	1132	4	"How Are You Gonna Keep 'Em Off of the Farm? (Agricultural Experience! Where is Digda!?)"; Transliteration: "Nōgyō Taiken! Diguda wa Dokoda!?" (Japanese: 農業体験！ディグダはどこだ！？)	January 22, 2021	September 10, 2021
1140	1133	5	"Healing the Healer! (Get the Legend?! Find the Guardian Water Deity Suicune!!)"; Transliteration: "Densetsu Getto!? Mizu no Shugoshin Suikun o Sagase!!" (Japanese: 伝説ゲット！？水の守護神スイクンを探せ！！)	January 29, 2021	September 10, 2021
1141	1134	6	"Sobble Spies a Stealthy Strategy! (Messon in Possible!)"; Transliteration: "Messon in Posshiburu!" (Japanese: メッソン・イン・ポッシブル！)	February 5, 2021	September 10, 2021
1142	1135	7	"The Tale of You and Glimwood Tangle! (The Tale of You and Me in Luminous Maze Forest)"; Transliteration: "Kimi to Ruminasu Meizu no Mori no Monogatari" (Japanese: 君とルミナスメイズの森の物語)	February 12, 2021	September 10, 2021
1143	1136	8	"Searching for Chivalry! (The Four Heavenly Kings Gampi! Chivalry Hall!!)"; Transliteration: "Shiten'nō Ganpi! Kishidō no Yakata!!" (Japanese: 四天王ガンピ！騎士道の館！！)	February 19, 2021	September 10, 2021
1144	1137	9	"Memories of a Warming Kindness! (Love is Koduck)"; Transliteration: "Koi wa Kodakku" (Japanese: 恋はコダック)	February 26, 2021	September 10, 2021
1145	1138	10	"A Rollicking Roll... (Panic! Gokulin Ball!!)"; Transliteration: "Panikku! Gokurin-dama!!" (Japanese: パニック！ゴクリン球！！)	March 5, 2021	September 10, 2021
1145	1138	10	"Eyes on the Goal! (Come on Kamukame Turtle Race!)"; Transliteration: "Kamon Kamukame Kame Rēsu!" (Japanese: カモンカムカメカメレース！)	March 5, 2021	September 10, 2021
1146	1139	11	"When a House is Not a Home! (Lost Sarunori! Who is the Trainer!?)"; Transliteration: "Maigo no Sarunori! Torēnā wa Dareda!?" (Japanese: 迷子のサルノリ！トレーナーは誰だ！？)	March 12, 2021	September 10, 2021
1147	1140	12	"Beyond Chivalry... Aiming to be a Leek Master! (Aim to Be a Scallion Master! Charge with Chivalry!!)"; Transliteration: "Mezase Negi Masutā! Tsuranuke Kishidō!!" (Japanese: めざせネギマスター！つらぬけ騎士道！！)	March 19, 2021	September 10, 2021
1148	1141	13	"Searching for Service with a Smile! (Leave Everything To Us! The Plusle and Minun Handymen!!)"; Transliteration: "Marutto Omakase! Purasuru Mainan Benriya-san!!" (Japanese: まるっとおまかせ！プラスルマイナン便利屋さん！！)	April 9, 2021	January 21, 2022
1149	1142	14	"Not Too Close for Comfort! (Damp Jimereon)"; Transliteration: "Jimejime Jimereon" (Japanese: じめじめジメレオン)	April 16, 2021	January 21, 2022
1150	1143	15	"On Land, In the Sea, and to the Future! (Challenge! Pokémon Marine Athletic!!)"; Transliteration: "Chōsen! Pokémon Marin Asurechikku!!" (Japanese: 挑戦！ポケモンマリンアスレチック！！)	April 23, 2021	January 21, 2022
1151	1144	16	"Absol Absolved! (The Detested Absol!)"; Transliteration: "Kirawareta Abusoru" (Japanese: 嫌われたアブソル)	April 30, 2021	January 21, 2022
1152	1145	17	"Thrash of the Titans! (Dragon Battle! Satoshi vs. Iris!!)"; Transliteration: "Doragon Batoru! Satoshi Buiesu Airisu!!" (Japanese: ドラゴンバトル！サトシVSアイリス！！)	May 7, 2021	January 21, 2022
1153	1146	18	"Under Color of Darkness! (Flabebe's White Flower)"; Transliteration: "Furabebe no Shiroi Hana" (Japanese: フラベベの白い花)	May 14, 2021	January 21, 2022
1154	1147	19	"Sleuths for Truth! (Suspect Pikachu!?)"; Transliteration: "Yōgisha Pikachū!?" (Japanese: 容疑者ピカチュウ！？)	May 21, 2021	January 21, 2022
1155	1148	20	"Advice to Goh! (Rivals for Go?! The Road to Mew!!)"; Transliteration: "Gō ni Raibaru!? Myū e no Michi!!" (Japanese: ゴウにライバル！？ミュウへの道！！)	May 28, 2021	January 21, 2022
1156	1149	21	"Errand Endurance! (Watch Over My First Errand!)"; Transliteration: "Hajimete no Otsukai Mimamoritai!" (Japanese: はじめてのおつかい見守りたいっ！)	June 4, 2021	January 21, 2022
1157	1150	22	"Take My Thief! Please! (Please! Get Morpeko!!)"; Transliteration: "Onegai! Morupeko Getto Shite!!" (Japanese: おねがい！モルペコゲットして！！)	June 11, 2021	January 21, 2022
1158	1151	23	"Leaping Toward the Dream! (Let's Go! Project Mew!!)"; Transliteration: "Rettsu Gō! Purojekuto Myū!!" (Japanese: レッツゴー！プロジェクト・ミュウ！！)	June 18, 2021	January 21, 2022
1159	1152	24	"Everybody's Doing the Underground Shuffle! (Shuffle Panic in the Underground Labyrinth!?)"; Transliteration: "Chika Meikyū Shaffuru Panikku!?" (Japanese: 地下迷宮シャッフルパニック！？)	June 25, 2021	January 21, 2022
1160	1153	25	"Grabbing the Brass Ring! (Captain Pikachu! Advance Tairetsu!!)"; Transliteration: "Pikachū Taichō! Susume Tairētsu!!" (Japanese: ピカチュウ隊長！進めタイレーツ！！)	July 16, 2021	January 21, 2022
1161	1154	26	"Nightfall? Nightmares! (Darkrai - Midsummer Night's Dream)"; Transliteration: "Dākurai - Manatsu no Yo no Yume" (Japanese: ダークライ 真夏の夜の夢)	July 23, 2021	January 21, 2022
1162	1155	27	"A Midsummer Night's Light! (Cresselia - Midsummer Night's Light)"; Transliteration: "Kureseria - Manatsu no Yo no Hikari" (Japanese: クレセリア 真夏の夜の光)	July 30, 2021	January 21, 2022
1163	1156	28	"All Out, All of the Time! (Full Power! Alola Uninhabited Island Race!!)"; Transliteration: "Zenryoku! Arōra Mujintō Rēsu!!" (Japanese: ゼンリョク！アローラ無人島レース！！)	August 13, 2021	May 26, 2022
1164	1157	29	"Ultra Exciting from the Shocking Start! (Super Electromagnetic Hyper Class Battle!)"; Transliteration: "Chō Denji Haipā Kurasu Batoru!" (Japanese: 超電磁ハイパークラスバトル！)	August 20, 2021	May 26, 2022
1165	1158	30	"Detective Drizzile! (The Targeted Sakuragi Institute!)"; Transliteration: "Nerawareta Sakuragi Kenkyūjo!" (Japanese: 狙われたサクラギ研究所！)	August 27, 2021	May 26, 2022
1166	1159	31	"Night and Day, You Are the Ones! (The Moon and the Sun, Koharu and Haruhi!)"; Transliteration: "Tsuki to Taiyō, Koharu to Haruhi" (Japanese: 月と太陽、コハルとハルヒ)	September 3, 2021	May 26, 2022
1167	1160	32	"Trial on a Golden Scale! (Trial Mission! Ulgamoth's Golden Scales!!)"; Transliteration: "Toraiaru Misshon! Urugamosu Ōgon no Rinpun!" (Japanese: トライアルミッション！ウルガモス黄金の鱗粉！！)	September 10, 2021	May 26, 2022
1168	1161	33	"Mad About Blue! (Clash!? Blue Pokémania!)"; Transliteration: "Gekitotsu!? Ao Pokemania!" (Japanese: 激突！？青ポケマニア！)	September 17, 2021	May 26, 2022
1169	1162	34	"The Sweet Taste of Battle! (Mawhip's Sweet Battle!?)"; Transliteration: "Mahoippu no Amāi Batoru!?" (Japanese: マホイップの甘～いバトル！？)	October 1, 2021	May 26, 2022
1170	1163	35	"Star Night, Star Flight! (The Py That Became A Star)"; Transliteration: "Ohoshi-sama ni Natta Pī" (Japanese: お星さまになったピィ)	October 8, 2021	May 26, 2022
1171	1164	36	"An Adventure of Mega Proportions! (The Lucarionite! Great Adventure on Mega Island!!)"; Transliteration: "Rukarionaito! Mega Jima Dai Bōken!!" (Japanese: ルカリオナイト！メガ島大冒険！！)	October 22, 2021	May 26, 2022
1172	1165	37	"Battle Three with Bea! (Rival Showdown! Satoshi vs. Saito!!)"; Transliteration: "Raibaru Kessen! Satoshi Buiesu Saitō!!" (Japanese: ライバル決戦！サトシVSサイトウ！！)	October 29, 2021	May 26, 2022
1173	1166	38	"A Battle of Mega Versus Max! (Mega Evolution vs. Kyodaimax!)"; Transliteration: "Mega Shinka Buiesu Kyodaimakkusu" (Japanese: メガシンカVSキョダイマックス)	November 5, 2021	May 26, 2022
1174	1167	39	"Breaking the Ice! (The Ice Queen and Glaceon!)"; Transliteration: "Kōri no Joō to Gureishia" (Japanese: 氷の女王とグレイシア)	November 12, 2021	May 26, 2022
1175	1168	40	"Looking Out for Number Two! (Trial Mission! The Deep Sea Diver Research Team!!)"; Transliteration: "Toraiaru Misshon! Shinkai Sensui Chōsa-dan!!" (Japanese: トライアルミッション！深海潜水調査団！！)	November 19, 2021	May 26, 2022
1176	1169	41	"The Gates of Warp! (Dialga & Palkia! The Space-time Cataclysm!!)"; Transliteration: "Diaruga Ando Parukia! Jikū Dai Ihen!!" (Japanese: ディアルガ&パルキア！時空大異変！！)	December 3, 2021	May 26, 2022
1177	1170	42	"Showdown at the Gates of Warp! (Dialga & Palkia! The Decisive Space-time Battle!!)"; Transliteration: "Diaruga Ando Parukia! Jikū Dai Kessen!!" (Japanese: ディアルガ&パルキア！時空大決戦！！)	December 10, 2021	May 26, 2022

=== Season 25: Ultimate Journeys (2021–23) ===
Jap. overall (Note: The English episode numbers are based on their first streaming in the United States on Netflix. Other English-speaking nations largely follow either this order or the Japanese order. Episodes released on Netflix in the U.S. are released quarterly while those on TV networks outside of the U.S. are aired weekly.)	Eng. overall	No. in season	English title Japanese title	Original release date	English release date
Pokémon Ultimate Journeys: The Series
1178	1171	1	"The Spectral Express! (The Ghost Train Departs...)"; Transliteration: "Gōsuto Ressha, Shuppatsu, da yo..." (Japanese: ゴースト列車、出発、だよ...)	December 17, 2021	October 21, 2022
1179	1172	2	"The Winding Path to Greatness! (Gangar Does Its Best! The Road to Kyodaimax!!)"; Transliteration: "Gengā Ganbaru! Kyodaimakkusu e no Michi!!" (Japanese: ゲンガー頑張る！キョダイマックスへの道！！)	December 24, 2021	October 21, 2022
1180	1173	3	"It's All in the Name! (Your Name is Francoise)"; Transliteration: "Kimi no Na wa Furansowāzu" (Japanese: 君の名はフランソワーズ)	January 14, 2022	October 21, 2022
1181	1174	4	"Suffering the Flings and Arrows! (The Heracross Loss, the Kailios in Love)"; Transliteration: "Herakurosu Rosu, Koisuru Kairosu" (Japanese: ヘラクロスロス、恋するカイロス)	January 21, 2022	October 21, 2022
1182	1175	5	"The Good, The Bad, and The Lucky! (Farewell! The Wandering Rocket Gang!)"; Transliteration: "Saraba! Sasurai no Roketto-dan!" (Japanese: サラバ！さすらいのロケット団！)	January 28, 2022	October 21, 2022
1183	1176	6	"Lighting the Way Home! (Reach Space! Denryu's Light!!)"; Transliteration: "Uchū ni Todoke! Denryū no Hikari!!" (Japanese: 宇宙にとどけ！デンリュウの光！！)	February 4, 2022	October 21, 2022
1184	1177	7	"An Evolution in Taste! (Yadoking! Curry Encounter!!)"; Transliteration: "Yadokingu! Karē Naru Sōgū!!" (Japanese: ヤドキング！カレーなる遭遇！！)	February 11, 2022	October 21, 2022
1185	1178	8	"Out of Their Elements! (Pokémon Circus! Booster and Thunders!!)"; Transliteration: "Pokemon Sākasu! Būsutā to Sandāsu!!" (Japanese: ポケモンサーカス！ブースターとサンダース！！)	February 18, 2022	October 21, 2022
1186	1179	9	"Battling Turned Up to Eleven! (Mary from Spiketown!)"; Transliteration: "Supaikutaun no Marī!" (Japanese: スパイクタウンのマリィ！)	February 25, 2022	October 21, 2022
1187	1180	10	"Meeting Up with the Monarch! (Adhesion! Dande's Special Training!!)"; Transliteration: "Mitchaku! Dande no Supesharu Torēningu!!" (Japanese: 密着！ダンデのスペシャルトレーニング！！)	March 4, 2022	October 21, 2022
1188	1181	11	"A One-Stick Wonder! (The One Stick, Bacchinkey!)"; Transliteration: "Sutikku Ippon, Bachinkī!" (Japanese: スティック一本、バチンキー！)	March 11, 2022	October 21, 2022
1189	1182	12	"Battling in the Freezing Raid! (Trial Mission! A Frozen Raid Battle!!)"; Transliteration: "Toraiaru Misshon! Hyōketsu no Reido Batoru!!" (Japanese: トライアルミッション！氷結のレイドバトル！！)	March 18, 2022	October 21, 2022
1190	1183	13	"The Future is Now, Thanks to Strategy! (Satoshi and Citron! Great Special Friendship Training!!)"; Transliteration: "Satoshi to Shitoron! Yūjō Dai Tokkun!!" (Japanese: サトシとシトロン！友情大特訓！！)	April 1, 2022	February 24, 2023
1191	1184	14	"Taking Two for the Team! (Hyper Class! Vs. Elite Four Dracaena!!)"; Transliteration: "Haipā Kurasu! Buiesu Shiten'nō Dorasena!!" (Japanese: ハイパークラス！VS四天王ドラセナ！！)	April 1, 2022	February 24, 2023
1192	1185	15	"Reuniting for the First Time! (Eievui and Nymphia! Encounter and Reunion!!)"; Transliteration: "Ībui to Ninfia! Deai to Saikai!!" (Japanese: イーブイとニンフィア！出会いと再会！！)	April 8, 2022	February 24, 2023
1193	1186	16	"Radio Lulled the Mischievous Stars! (A New Program! The Rocket Gang Undercover Kingdom Radio!!)"; Transliteration: "Shin Bangumi! Roketto-dan Naisho Ōkoku Rajio!!" (Japanese: 新番組！ロケット団ないしょ王国ラジオ！！)	April 15, 2022	February 24, 2023
1194	1187	17	"Big Brother to the Rescue! (Help Us, Big Bro Wanpachi!)"; Transliteration: "Tasukete, Wanpachi no Aniki!" (Japanese: 助けて、ワンパチのアニキ！)	April 22, 2022	February 24, 2023
1195	1188	18	"Catching the Aura of Fate! (Lucario and Gekkouga! The Wave Guidance of Fate!!)"; Transliteration: "Rukario to Gekkōga! Unmei no Hadō!" (Japanese: ルカリオとゲッコウガ！運命の波導！！)	April 29, 2022	February 24, 2023
1196	1189	19	"Aim for the Eight! (VS Kibana! Battle for Masters Eight!!)"; Transliteration: "VS Kibana! Masutāzueito o kaketa tatakai!!" (Japanese: VSキバナ！マスターズエイトをかけた戦い！！)	May 6, 2022	February 24, 2023
1197	1190	20	"Narrowing the Chaser Chase! (Battle Royale Betrayal!)"; Transliteration: "Uragiri no Batturu Royaru!" (Japanese: 裏切りのバトルロイヤル！)	May 13, 2022	February 24, 2023
1198	1191	21	"The Homecoming Crown! (Mohn and Lilie, Snowfield Reunion)"; Transliteration: "Moon to Riirie, Setsugen no Saikai" (Japanese: モーンとリーリエ、雪原の再会)	May 20, 2022	February 24, 2023
1199	1192	22	"Helping the Hometown Hero! (A Triumphant Return! The Alola Champion!!)"; Transliteration: "Gaisen! Arora Champion!!" (Japanese: 凱旋！ アローラチャンピオン！！)	May 27, 2022	February 24, 2023
1200	1193	23	"Chasing to the Finish! (The Last Mission! Catch Regieleki and Regidrago!!)"; Transliteration: "Rasuto Misshon! Regieleki Regidorago o Getto Seyo!!" (Japanese: ラストミッション！ レジエレキ・レジドラゴをゲットせよ！！)	June 3, 2022	February 24, 2023
1201	1194	24	"Friends, Rivals, Lend Me Your Spirit! (Training Battle of Flames! Satoshi VS Shinji!!)"; Transliteration: "Honou no Tokkun Batoru! Satoshi tai Shinji!!" (Japanese: 炎の特訓バトル！サトシ対シンジ！！)	June 10, 2022	February 24, 2023
1202	1195	25	"Curtain Up! Fight the Fights! (Opening! Masters Tournament!!)"; Transliteration: "Kaimaku! Masutaazu Toonamento!!" (Japanese: 開幕！マスターズトーナメント！！)	June 17, 2022	February 24, 2023
1203	1196	26	"Pride of a Champion! (Champions' Pride! Wataru VS Carnet!!)"; Transliteration: "Champion no Hokori! Wataru VS Carnet!!" (Japanese: チャンピオンの誇り！ワタルVSカルネ！！)	July 8, 2022	February 24, 2023
1204	1197	27	"The Fiery Road to Mastership! (VS Shirona! Iris' Road to Dragon Master)"; Transliteration: "VS Shirona! Iris Dragon Master e no Michi" (Japanese: VSシロナ！アイリスドラゴンマスターへの道！！)	July 15, 2022	February 24, 2023
1205	1198	28	"Battling as Hard as Stone! (Satoshi Heads Into Battle! VS Daigo!!)"; Transliteration: "Satoshi Shutsujin! VS Daigo!!" (Japanese: サトシ出陣！VSダイゴ！！)	July 22, 2022	June 23, 2023
1206	—	29	"Koharu and Eievui - The Miracle of Evolution"; Transliteration: "Koharu and Eevee - Shinka no Kiseki" (Japanese: コハルとイーブイ しんかのきせき)	July 29, 2022	—
1207	1199	30	"Infinite Possibilities! (Koharu and Eievui, the Possibilities are Endless!)"; Transliteration: "Koharu to Eievui, Kanousei wa Mugendai!" (Japanese: コハルとイーブイ、可能性は無限大！)	August 5, 2022	June 23, 2023
1208	—	31	"The Climax Begins! Satoshi's Masters Tournament Experience!!"; Transliteration: "Saikouchou Shidou! Satoshi no Master Tournament!!" (Japanese: 最高潮始動！サトシのマスターズトーナメント！！)	August 12, 2022	—
1209	1200	32	"It's... Champion Time! (The Semifinals I: Overwhelming Victory)"; Transliteration: "Semifainaru I: "Asshō"" (Japanese: セミファイナルI「圧勝」)	August 26, 2022	June 23, 2023
1210	1201	33	"Bewitch, Battle, and Bewilder! (The Semifinals II: Dazzle)"; Transliteration: "Semifainaru II: "Genwaku"" (Japanese: セミファイナルII「幻惑」)	September 2, 2022	June 23, 2023
1211	1202	34	"Valor: A Strategic Part of Battling! (The Semifinals III: Valor)"; Transliteration: "Semifainaru III: "Buyū"" (Japanese: セミファイナルIII「武勇」)	September 9, 2022	June 23, 2023
1212	1203	35	"Whittle While You Work! (The Semifinals IV: Impact)"; Transliteration: "Semifainaru IV: "Shōgeki"" (Japanese: セミファイナルIV「衝撃」)	September 16, 2022	June 23, 2023
1213	—	36	"GO FOR DREAM! Go's Road to Mew!!"; Transliteration: "GO FOR DREAM! Gō, Yume e no Michi!!" (Japanese: GO FOR DREAM！ゴウ、夢への道！！)	September 23, 2022	—
1214	1204	37	"Just a Scone's Throw From Here! (Go and Aceburn! The Place of Beginning!!)"; Transliteration: "Gō to Aceburn! Hajimari no Basho!!" (Japanese: ゴウとエースバーン！はじまりの場所！！)	September 30, 2022	June 23, 2023
1215	—	38	"Climax! The Night Before the Decisive Battle! Satoshi VS Dande!!"; Transliteration: "Saikōchō! Kessen Zen'ya Satoshi VS Dande!!" (Japanese: 最高潮！決戦前夜サトシVSダンデ！！)	October 14, 2022	—
1216	1205	39	"A Flood of Torrential Gains! (The Finals I: "Torrent")"; Transliteration: "Fainaru I: "Gekiryū"" (Japanese: ファイナルI「激流」)	October 21, 2022	June 23, 2023
1217	1206	40	"Toying With Your Motions! (The Finals II: "Toy Around")"; Transliteration: "Fainaru II: "Honrō"" (Japanese: ファイナルII「翻弄」)	October 28, 2022	June 23, 2023
1218	1207	41	"Paring Pokémon While Parrying! (The Finals III: "The Strongest")"; Transliteration: "Fainaru III: "Saikyō"" (Japanese: ファイナルIII「最強」)	November 4, 2022	June 23, 2023
1219	1208	42	"Partners in Time! (The Finals IV: "Partner")"; Transliteration: "Fainaru IV: "Aibō"" (Japanese: ファイナルIV「相棒」)	November 11, 2022	June 23, 2023
1220	1209	43	"The Mew from Here! (Project Mew)"; Transliteration: "Project Mew" (Japanese: プロジェクト・ミュウ)	November 25, 2022	June 23, 2023
1221	1210	44	"In the Palms of our Hands! (Seize the Future!)"; Transliteration: "Tsukamitoru Mirai!" (Japanese: つかみとる未来！)	December 2, 2022	June 23, 2023
1222	1211	45	"Heroes Unite! (Pokémon! I'm Glad I Got to Meet You!)"; Transliteration: "Pokemon! Kimi ni Aete Yokatta!" (Japanese: ポケモン！きみにあえてよかった！)	December 9, 2022	June 23, 2023
1223	1212	46	"This Could be the Start of Something Big! (Satoshi and Go! Setting Off on a New Journey!!)"; Transliteration: "Satoshi to Gō! Arata Naru o Tabidachi!!" (Japanese: サトシとゴウ！ 新たなるを旅立ち！！)	December 16, 2022	June 23, 2023
Pokémon: To Be a Pokémon Master
1224	1213	47	"The Road Most Traveled! (Winds of Beginning! The Endless Road!!)"; Transliteration: "Hajimari no Kaze! Owari no Nai Michi!!" (Japanese: はじまりの風！ 終わりのない道!!)	January 13, 2023	September 8, 2023
1225	1214	48	"A Fated Face-Off! (Satoshi VS Kasumi! Seaside Battle One-on-One!!)"; Transliteration: "Satoshi VS Kasumi! Umibe no Ikki-uchi!!" (Japanese: サトシVSカスミ！うみべのいっきうち！！)	January 20, 2023	September 8, 2023
1226	1215	49	"Must Be Our Heroes and the Witch! (Takeshi and Dent and the Forest Witch!)"; Transliteration: "Takeshi to Dento to Mori no Majo!" (Japanese: タケシとデントともりのまじょ！)	January 27, 2023	September 8, 2023
1227	1216	50	"Bearing Down Easy! (Tunbear's Sigh!)"; Transliteration: "Tunbear no Tameiki!" (Japanese: ツンベアーのためいき！)	February 3, 2023	September 8, 2023
1228	1217	51	"A Squad's Worth of Passion! (Burn! The Zenigame Fire Brigade!!)"; Transliteration: "Moeyo! Zenigame Shōbōdan!!" (Japanese: もえよ！ゼニガメしょうぼうだん！！)	February 10, 2023	September 8, 2023
1229	1218	52	"The Same Moon, Now and Forever! (And We're Looking at the Same Moon!)"; Transliteration: "Soshite, Onaji Tsuki o Mite Iru!" (Japanese: そして、おなじ月をみている！)	February 17, 2023	September 8, 2023
1230	1219	53	"Ride, Lapras, Ride! (Riding on Laplace♪)"; Transliteration: "Laplace ni Notte♪" (Japanese: ラプラスにのって♪)	February 24, 2023	September 8, 2023
1231	1220	54	"Getting to the Heart of it All! (Juppeta's Search!)"; Transliteration: "Jupetta no Sagashi Mono!" (Japanese: ジュペッタのさがしもの！)	March 3, 2023	September 8, 2023
1232	1221	55	"Rocket Revengers! (Rocket-dan Strikes Back!)"; Transliteration: "Gyakushū no Roketto-dan!" (Japanese: 逆襲のロケット団！)	March 10, 2023	September 8, 2023
1233	1222	56	"Ash and Latios! (Satoshi and Latios!)"; Transliteration: "Satoshi to Ratiosu!" (Japanese: サトシとラティオス！)	March 17, 2023	September 8, 2023
1234	1223	57	"The Rainbow and the Pokémon Master!"; Transliteration: "Niji to Pokemon Masutā!" (Japanese: 虹とポケモンマスター！)	March 24, 2023	September 8, 2023

Jap. overall	Eng. overall	No. in season	English title Japanese title	Original release date	English release date
SP–11	SP–6	SP–1	"The Arceus Chronicles (Part 1)" (Satoshi and Go! Let's Go to the Sinnoh Fest!!); Transliteration: "Satoshi to gō! Shin'oufesu ni gō! !" (Japanese: サトシとゴウ！シンオウフェスにゴー！！)	January 21, 2022	September 23, 2022
SP–12	SP–7	SP–2	"The Arceus Chronicles (Part 2)" (Rampaging Heatran!!); Transliteration: "Hīdoran bakushin! !" (Japanese: ヒードラン爆進！！)	January 21, 2022	September 23, 2022
SP–13	SP–8	SP–3	"The Arceus Chronicles (Part 3)" (The Fierce Fighting at Mount Tengan!!); Transliteration: "Tengansan no dai nessen! !" (Japanese: テンガン山の大熱戦！！)	January 28, 2022	September 23, 2022
SP–14	SP–9	SP–4	"The Arceus Chronicles (Part 4)" (Miraculous Radiance! The Legend of Sinnoh!); Transliteration: "Kiseki no kagayaki! Shin'ō densetsu!" (Japanese: 奇跡の輝き！シンオウ伝説！)	January 28, 2022	September 23, 2022
SP–15	SP–10	SP–5	"Distant Blue Sky! (Pocket Monsters: The Distant Blue Sky)"; Transliteration: "Poketto Monsutā: Haruka Naru Aoi Sora" (Japanese: ポケットモンスター 遥かなる青い空)	December 23, 2022	September 8, 2023

=== Season 26: Horizons (2023–24) ===
Jpn. overall	Eng. overall	No. in season	English title Japanese title	Directed by	Written by	Animation directed by	Original release date	English release date
1235	1224	1	"The Pendant That Starts It All: Part One (The Pendant of Beginning, Part 1)"; Transliteration: "Hajimari no Pendanto Zenpen" (Japanese: はじまりのペンダント 前編)	Directed by : Saori Den; Storyboarded by : Saori Den & Tetsuo Yajima	Dai Satō	Yuki Masutani, Toshiko Nakaya, Natsumi Hattori & Izumi Shimura	April 14, 2023	December 1, 2023 (UK); March 7, 2024 (US)
1236	1225	2	"The Pendant That Starts It All: Part Two (The Pendant of Beginning, Part 2)"; Transliteration: "Hajimari no Pendanto Kōhen" (Japanese: はじまりのペンダント 後編)	Directed by : Makoto Oga & Ayumi Moriyama; Storyboarded by : Daiki Tomiyasu	Dai Satō	Toshihito Hirooka, Chiaki Kurakazu, Masaya Onishi, Miho Sugimoto & Sayo Sugiyama	April 14, 2023	December 1, 2023 (UK); March 7, 2024 (US)
1237	1226	3	"For Sure! 'Cause Sprigatito's with Me! (As Long as I'm With Nyahoja, I'm Sure)"; Transliteration: "Nyaoha to Nara, Kitto" (Japanese: ニャオハとなら、きっと)	Directed by : Junya Koshiba; Storyboarded by : Tetsuo Yajima	Naruki Nagakawa	Yoshitaka Yanagihara, Yūsuke Oshida & Makoto Shinjō	April 21, 2023	December 1, 2023 (UK); March 7, 2024 (US)
1238	1227	4	"The Treasure After the Storm! (A Washed-Ashore Treasure)"; Transliteration: "Nagaretsuita Takaramono" (Japanese: ながれついた宝もの)	Yūji Asada	Dai Satō	Masaaki Iwane & Izumi Shimura	April 28, 2023	December 1, 2023 (UK); March 7, 2024 (US)
1239	1228	5	"Found You, Fuecoco! (I Found You, Hogator)"; Transliteration: "Mitsuketa yo, Hogēta" (Japanese: みつけたよ、ホゲータ)	Directed by : Fumihiro Ueno; Storyboarded by : Hiromasa Amano	Muga Takeda	Takashi Shinohara	May 5, 2023	December 1, 2023 (UK); March 7, 2024 (US)
1240	1229	6	"The Ancient Poké Ball (The Ancient Monster Ball)"; Transliteration: "Inishie no Monsutā Bōru" (Japanese: いにしえのモンスターボール)	Yasuhiro Noda	Kureha Matsuzawa	Akihiko Oka, Izumi Shimura, Hiromi Niioka, Toshiya Yamada & Toshiko Nakaya	May 12, 2023	December 1, 2023 (UK); March 7, 2024 (US)
1241	1230	7	"Special Training with Cap! (Special Training! Captain Pikachu)"; Transliteration: "Tokkun! Kyaputen Pikachū" (Japanese: 特訓！キャプテンピカチュウ)	Directed by : Hiromichi Matano; Storyboarded by : Noriaki Saitō	Kureha Matsuzawa	Makoto Shinjō & Yuki Masutani	May 19, 2023	January 15, 2024 (UK); March 7, 2024 (US)
1242	1231	8	"The Door That Never Opens (The Secret of the Unopened Door)"; Transliteration: "Akazu no Tobira no Himitsu" (Japanese: あかずの扉のひみつ)	Directed by : Yoshihiko Iwata; Storyboarded by : Naruki Nagakawa	Hiromasa Amano	Masaya Ōnishi, Chiaki Kurakazu & Hiromi Sakai	May 26, 2023	January 15, 2024 (UK); March 7, 2024 (US)
1243	1232	9	"Welcome to Paldea! (Arrival in Paldea!)"; Transliteration: "Parudea Tōchaku!" (Japanese: パルデア到着！)	Yūji Asada	Dai Satō	Masaaki Iwane & Izumi Shimura	June 2, 2023	January 15, 2024 (UK); March 7, 2024 (US)
1244	1233	10	"Nemona and Brassius and... (With Nemo and Colza)"; Transliteration: "Nemo to Corusa to" (Japanese: ネモとコルサと)	Makoto Nakata	Muga Takeda	Yoshitaka Yanagihara, Yusuke Oshida & Toshiko Nakaya	June 9, 2023	January 15, 2024 (UK); March 7, 2024 (US)
1245	1234	11	"Arboliva's Forest (Oliva's Forest)"; Transliteration: "Orīva no Mori" (Japanese: オリーヴァの森)	Directed by : Fumihiro Ueno; Storyboarded by : Satoshi Shimizu	Naruki Nagakawa	Takashi Shinohara	June 16, 2023	January 15, 2024 (UK); March 7, 2024 (US)
1246	1235	12	"The Future I Choose"; Transliteration: "Watashi ga Erabu Mirai" (Japanese: わたしが選ぶ未来)	Directed by : Junya Koshiba; Storyboarded by : Hiromasa Amano	Kureha Matsuzawa	Izumi Shimura, Masaya Ōnishi, Shinichi Yoshino, Toshiko Nakaya & Kurika Yamagata	June 23, 2023	January 15, 2024 (UK); March 7, 2024 (US)
1247	1236	13	"An Unexpected Picnic! (A Sudden Picnic)"; Transliteration: "Picnic wa Totsuzen ni" (Japanese: ピクニックは突然に)	Directed by : Masashi Tsukino; Storyboarded by : Noriaki Saito	Kureha Matsuzawa	Hironori Hano & Cheom Hyang Go	July 14, 2023	January 15, 2024 (UK); May 10, 2024 (US)
1248	1237	14	"Fly! Wattrel!! (Fly! Kaiden!!)"; Transliteration: "Tobe! Kaiden!!" (Japanese: とべ！カイデン！！)	Directed by : Oh Jin Koo; Storyboarded by : Hiromasa Amano	Muga Takeda	Chiaki Kurakazu, Natsumi Hattori & Keita Hagiwara	July 21, 2023	January 15, 2024 (UK); May 10, 2024 (US)
1249	1238	15	"Someone We Can't See! Whosawhatsit? (It's Someone You Can't See! Whosawhatsit?)"; Transliteration: "Mienai Yatsu da! Nanimon nanja?" (Japanese: みえないヤツだ！何者(ナニモン)なんじゃ？)	Yūji Asada	Kureha Matsuzawa	Masaaki Iwane & Izumi Shimura	July 28, 2023	January 15, 2024 (UK); May 10, 2024 (US)
1250	1239	16	"Quaxly, We Can Do It (As Long As I'm With Kuwassu, I Can Do It)"; Transliteration: "Kuwassu to Nara, Dekiru yo" (Japanese: クワッスとなら、できるよ)	Hiroaki Takagi	Naruki Nagakawa	Yoshitaka Yanagihara & Yusuke Oshida	August 4, 2023	January 15, 2024 (UK); May 10, 2024 (US)
1251	1240	17	"Special Training Time! (Kaiden and Hogator: Secret Training!)"; Transliteration: "Kaiden to Hogēta: Himitsu no Dai Tokkun!" (Japanese: カイデンとホゲータ 秘密の大特訓！)	Directed by : Hiromichi Matano; Storyboarded by : Satoshi Shimizu	Michihiro Tsuchiya	Makoto Shinjō & Yuki Masutani	August 11, 2023	February 27, 2024 (UK); May 10, 2024 (US)
1252	1241	18	"Flying Pikachu, Rising Higher and Higher! (Flying Pikachu, Soaring High!)"; Transliteration: "Soratobu Pikachū, Doko Made mo Takaku!" (Japanese: そらとぶピカチュウ、どこまでも高く！)	Directed by : Makoto Nakata; Storyboarded by : Daiki Tomiyasu	Kureha Matsuzawa	Masaya Ōnishi, Yasue Ōno & Yusuke Oshida	August 18, 2023	February 27, 2024 (UK); May 10, 2024 (US)
1253	1242	19	"The Bittersweet Truth (The Truth About Mawhip)"; Transliteration: "Mahoippu no Honto" (Japanese: マホイップのホント)	Directed by : Fumihiro Ueno; Storyboarded by : Hiromasa Amano	Deko Akao	Takashi Shinohara	August 25, 2023	February 27, 2024 (UK); May 10, 2024 (US)
1254	1243	20	"Kabu's Battle Training! (Kabu's Battle Training)"; Transliteration: "Kabu-san no Batoru Shugyō" (Japanese: カブさんのバトル修行)	Directed by : Ayumi Moriyama; Storyboarded by : Noriaki Saitō	Michihiro Tsuchiya	Chiaki Kurakazu, Natsumi Hattori & Keita Hagiwara	September 1, 2023	February 27, 2024 (UK); May 10, 2024 (US)
1255	1244	21	"The Lonely Hatenna (The Lonely Mibrim)"; Transliteration: "Hitori Botchi no Miburimu" (Japanese: ひとりぼっちのミブリム)	Directed by : Masashi Tsukino; Storyboarded by : Noriaki Saitō	Naruki Nagakawa	Hironori Hano	September 8, 2023	March 27, 2024 (AUS); May 10, 2024 (US)
1256	1245	22	"Charge! Galar Mine! (Clash! Galar Mine)"; Transliteration: "Gekitotsu! Gararu Kōzan" (Japanese: 激突！ガラルこうざん)	Makoto Ōga	Muga Takeda	Yoshitaka Yanagihara & Yusuke Oshida	September 15, 2023	March 28, 2024 (AUS); May 10, 2024 (US)
1257	1246	23	"Fiery Galarian Moltres (Burning Galar Fire)"; Transliteration: "Moeagaru Gararu Faiyā" (Japanese: 燃え上がるガラルファイヤー)	Yūji Asada	Kureha Matsuzawa	Masaki Iwane & Izumi Shimura	September 22, 2023	March 29, 2024 (AUS); May 10, 2024 (US)
1258	1247	24	"Reunion at the Ancient Castle (Reunion at the Old Castle)"; Transliteration: "Kojō de no Saikai" (Japanese: 古城での再会)	Directed by : Hiromichi Matano; Storyboarded by : Hiromasa Amano	Dai Satō	Makoto Shinjō & Yuki Masutani	October 13, 2023	May 2, 2024 (AUS); August 9, 2024 (US)
1259	1248	25	"Rivals in the Dark of Night (Rivals in the Dark Night)"; Transliteration: "Yamiyo no Raibaru" (Japanese: 闇夜の強敵(ライバル))	Hiroaki Takagi	Dai Satō	Keita Hagiwara, Chiaki Kurakazu, Natsumi Hattori, Toshiko Nakaya, Masaya Ōnishi, Yusuke Oshida, Koki Yanagihara, Hiromi Niioka & Saki Ebisawa	October 20, 2023	May 3, 2024 (AUS); August 9, 2024 (US)
1260	1249	26	"Terapagos's Adventure"; Transliteration: "Terapagosu no Bōken" (Japanese: テラパゴスの冒険)	Directed by : Satoshi Saga; Storyboarded by : Noriaki Saitō	Kureha Matsuzawa	Ryōtarō Aoba, Kōsuke Hiramatsu & Naoko Yamamoto	October 27, 2023	May 27, 2024 (UK); August 9, 2024 (US)
1261	1250	27	"As Long as I'm With My Friends"; Transliteration: "Nakama to Issho nara" (Japanese: 仲間といっしょなら)	Directed by : Fumihiro Ueno; Storyboarded by : Hiromasa Amano	Naruki Nagakawa	Takashi Shinohara	November 3, 2023	May 27, 2024 (UK); August 9, 2024 (US)
1262	1251	28	"The Stolen Treasure"; Transliteration: "Nusumareta Takaramono" (Japanese: ぬすまれた宝もの)	Yūji Asada	Michihiro Tsuchiya	Masaaki Iwane	November 10, 2023	May 27, 2024 (UK); August 9, 2024 (US)
1263	1252	29	"Orla and the Poké Ball Smith (Orio and the Monster Ball Craftsman)"; Transliteration: "Orio to Monsutā Bōru Shokunin" (Japanese: オリオとモンスターボール職人)	Directed by : Yoshihiko Iwata; Storyboarded by : Noriaki Saitō	Naohiro Fukushima	Yoshitaka Yanagihara, Masaya Ōnishi & Hiromi Sakai	November 17, 2023	May 27, 2024 (UK); August 9, 2024 (US)
1264	1253	30	"Slip and Crash! A Mystery Pokémon?! (The Slipping, Smashing Mystery Pokémon!?)"; Transliteration: "Zurūtto Gachan de Nazo Pokemon!?" (Japanese: ズル～っとガチャンで謎ポケモン！？)	Ayumi Moriyama	Deko Akao	Chiaki Kurakazu, Megumi Matsumoto, Keita Hagiwara, Masaya Ōnishi, Yoshitaka Yanagihara, Yusuke Oshida & Kenji Katō	November 24, 2023	May 27, 2024 (UK); August 9, 2024 (US)
1265	1254	31	"Song Within the Mist (The Singing Voice in the White Mist)"; Transliteration: "Shiroi Kiri no Utagoe" (Japanese: 白い霧の歌声)	Directed by : Hiromichi Matano; Storyboarded by : Shōji Nishida	Kureha Matsuzawa	Makoto Shinjō & Yuki Masutani	December 1, 2023	May 27, 2024 (UK); August 9, 2024 (US)
1266	1255	32	"Lapras's Feelings for its Friends (Laplace's Memories of Its Companions)"; Transliteration: "Rapurasu no Omoi, Nakama o Omoi" (Japanese: ラプラスの想い、仲間を想い)	Directed by : Hiroyuki Okuno; Storyboarded by : Hiromasa Amano	Kureha Matsuzawa	Ryōtarō Aoba, Kōsuke Hiramatsu & Naoko Yamamoto	December 8, 2023	May 27, 2024 (UK); August 9, 2024 (US)
1267	1256	33	"Roar of the Black Rayquaza (The Roaring Black Rayquaza)"; Transliteration: "Hōkō no Kuroi Rekkūza" (Japanese: 咆吼の黒いレックウザ)	Makoto Nakata	Dai Satō	Yusuke Oshida, Natsumi Hattori & Toshiko Nakaya	December 15, 2023	July 22, 2024 (UK); August 9, 2024 (US)
1268	1257	34	"Respective Departures"; Transliteration: "Sorezore no Tabidachi" (Japanese: それぞれの旅立ち)	Directed by : Yoshiko Iwata; Storyboarded by : Tetsuo Yajima	Naruki Nagakawa	Yoshitaka Yanagihara, Natsumi Hattori & Masaya Ōnishi	December 22, 2023	July 22, 2024 (UK); August 9, 2024 (US)
1269	1258	35	"The Wild Pair, Friede and Cap! (A Duo in the Wilderness: Friede and Cap)"; Transliteration: "Kōya no Futari: Furīdo to Kyappu" (Japanese: 荒野のふたり フリードとキャップ)	Yūji Asada	Michihiro Tsuchiya	Masaaki Iwane & Izumi Shimura	January 12, 2024	July 22, 2024 (UK); November 22, 2024 (US)
1270	1259	36	"Mission: Find Oinkologne's Partner! (Operation Perfuton Friendship!)"; Transliteration: "Pafuyūton Nakayoshi Dai Sakusen!" (Japanese: パフュートン仲良し大作戦！)	Directed by : Fumihiro Ueno; Storyboarded by : Hiromasa Amano	Naohiro Fukushima	Takashi Shinohara	January 19, 2024	July 22, 2024 (UK); November 22, 2024 (US)
1271	1260	37	"Fuecoco... Becomes a Crook?! (Hogator, You're Becoming a Delinquent?!)"; Transliteration: "Hogēta, Waru ni Naru!?" (Japanese: ホゲータ、ワルになる！？)	Directed by : Yasuhiro Noda; Storyboarded by : Noriaki Saitō	Kimiko Ueno	Chiaki Kurakazu, Keita Hagiwara & Megumi Matsumoto	January 26, 2024	July 22, 2024 (UK); November 22, 2024 (US)
1272	1261	38	"The SOS is from Tandemaus? (SOS from Wakkanezumi?)"; Transliteration: "Esu Ō Esu wa Wakkanezumi kara?" (Japanese: SOSはワッカネズミから？)	Directed by : Hiromichi Matano; Storyboarded by : Masato Satō	Deko Akao	Makoto Shinjō & Yuki Masutani	February 2, 2024	July 22, 2024 (UK); November 22, 2024 (US)
1273	1262	39	"Tinkatink's Ideal Hammer (Kanuchan and Its Special Hammer)"; Transliteration: "Kanuchan to Kodawari no Hanmā" (Japanese: カヌチャンとこだわりのハンマー)	Directed by : Yūichi Abe; Storyboarded by : Tetsuo Yajima	Naohiro Fukushima	Yusuke Oshida & Toshiko Nakaya	February 9, 2024	July 22, 2024 (UK); November 22, 2024 (US)
1274	1263	40	"Farewell, Sprigatito? (Farewell, Nyahoja?)"; Transliteration: "Sayonara, Nyaoha?" (Japanese: さよなら、ニャオハ？)	Directed by : Hiroyuki Okuno; Storyboarded by : Hiromasa Amano	Michihiro Tsuchiya	Ryōtarō Aoba, Kōsuke Hiramatsu & Pei Qi Peng	February 16, 2024	July 22, 2024 (UK); November 22, 2024 (US)
1275	1264	41	"A Wild Mom Appears! (Enter the Intense Mom!)"; Transliteration: "Kyōretsu Kā-chan Arawaru!" (Japanese: キョーレツかーちゃん現る！)	Yūji Asada	Deko Akao	Masaaki Iwane & Izumi Shimura	March 1, 2024	September 9, 2024 (UK); November 22, 2024 (US)
1276	1265	42	"Transform! Hero of the Seas, Palafin (Transform! The Hero of the Sea, Irukaman!)"; Transliteration: "Henshin! Umi no Hīrō Irukaman" (Japanese: 変身！海のヒーローイルカマン！)	Ayumi Moriyama	Kimiko Ueno	Yūhei Takaboshi, Natsumi Hattori & Megumi Matsumoto	March 8, 2024	September 9, 2024 (UK); November 22, 2024 (US)
1277	1266	43	"A Challenge from the Explorers (A Letter of Challenge from the Explorers)"; Transliteration: "Ekusupurōrāzu kara no Hatashijō" (Japanese: エクスプローラーズからの果たし状)	Directed by : Yoshihiko Iwata; Storyboarded by : Hiromasa Amano & Daiki Tomiyasu	Naruki Nagakawa	Yoshitaka Yanagihara & Keita Hagiwara	March 15, 2024	September 9, 2024 (UK); November 22, 2024 (US)
1278	1267	44	"The Plan to Capture Rayquaza (A Plan to Capture Rayquaza)"; Transliteration: "Rekkūza Hokaku Keikan" (Japanese: レックウザ捕獲計画)	Hiroaki Takagi	Kureha Matsuzawa	Yusuke Oshida, Chiaki Kurakazu, Masaya Ōnishi & Akihiko Oka	March 22, 2024	September 9, 2024 (UK); November 22, 2024 (US)
1279	1268	45	"From So Far Away (To A Place Far, Far Away)"; Transliteration: "Haruka, Tooku made" (Japanese: はるか、遠くまで)	Directed by : Fumihiro Ueno; Storyboarded by : Hiromasa Amano & Tetsuo Yajima	Kureha Matsuzawa	Takashi Shinohara	March 29, 2024	September 9, 2024 (UK); November 22, 2024 (US)

=== Season 27: Horizons — The Search for Laqua (2024–25) ===
Jap. overall	Eng. overall	No. in season	English title Japanese title	Directed by	Written by	Animation directed by	Original release date	English release date
1280	1269	1	"Welcome to Naranja Academy! (How Thrilling! Orange Academy)"; Transliteration: "Dokidoki! Orenji Akademī" (Japanese: ドキドキ！オレンジアカデミー)	Makoto Nakata	Dai Satō	Toshiko Nakaya, Yūhei Takaboshi, Izumi Shimura, Sakai Hiromi, Chiaki Kurakazu & Shūji Tanaka	April 12, 2024	January 13, 2025 (UK); February 7, 2025 (US)
1281	1270	2	"Put Your Heart Into It! (Liko and Nyarote, Put All Your Heart Into It)"; Transliteration: "Riko to Nyarōte, Kokoro o Komete" (Japanese: リコとニャローテ、心をこめて)	Directed by : Hiromichi Matano; Storyboarded by : Hiromasa Amano	Kureha Matsuzawa	Makoto Shinjō	April 19, 2024	January 13, 2025 (UK); February 7, 2025 (US)
1282	1271	3	"Sparkle! The Glow of Flame and Art! (Shine! The Sparkle of Fire and Art)"; Transliteration: "Kagayake! Honō to Āto no Kirameki" (Japanese: 輝け！炎とアートのきらめき)	Yūji Asada	Michihiro Tsuchiya	Masaaki Iwane & Izumi Shimura	May 3, 2024	January 13, 2025 (UK); February 7, 2025 (US)
1283	1272	4	"Dot and Nidothing (Dot and Gurumin)"; Transliteration: "Dotto to Gurumin" (Japanese: ドットとぐるみん)	Directed by : Yasuhiro Noda; Storyboarded by : Hiromasa Amano & Yūji Asada	Naohiro Fukushima	Yoshitaka Yanagihara, Natsumi Hattori & Masaya Ōnishi	May 10, 2024	January 13, 2025 (UK); February 7, 2025 (US)
1284	1273	5	"Trending Terastallisation! Dance, Dance, Quaxly! (Shine, Terastal! Dance Dance Kuwassu!!)"; Transliteration: "Haero Terasutaru! Dansu Dansu Kuwassu!!" (Japanese: 映えろテラスタル！ダンス・ダンス・クワッス！！)	Directed by : Takashi Kojima; Storyboarded by : Noriaki Saitō & Yusuke Oshida	Naohiro Fukushima	Yusuke Oshida, Keita Hagiwara, Megumi Matsumoto, Shin'ichi Yoshino & Shūji Tanaka	May 17, 2024	January 13, 2025 (UK); February 7, 2025 (US)
1285	1274	6	"The Flower Tower (A Prickly Nyarote?! The Mysterious Flower Pillar)"; Transliteration: "Togetoge Nyarōte!? Fushigi na Hanabashira" (Japanese: トゲトゲニャローテ！？不思議な花ばしら)	Directed by : Ayumi Moriyama; Storyboarded by : Kazuaki Mōri	Deko Akao	Chiaki Kurakazu, Toshiko Nakaya, Yūhei Takaboshi, Yūki Kitajima & Prommee Saksit	May 24, 2024	January 13, 2025 (UK); February 7, 2025 (US)
1286	1275	7	"Wattrel's High Wind Warning! (Kaiden, High Wind Warning!)"; Transliteration: "Kaiden, Kyōfū Chūihō!" (Japanese: カイデン、強風注意報！)	Directed by : Fumihiro Ueno; Storyboarded by : Hiromasa Amano	Kimiko Ueno	Takashi Shinohara	May 31, 2024	January 13, 2025 (UK); February 7, 2025 (US)
1287	1276	8	"Hatenna and the Otherworldly (Mibrim and the Unworldly)"; Transliteration: "Miburimu to Konoyo Narazaru Mono" (Japanese: ミブリムとこの世ならざるもの)	Yūji Asada	Michihiro Tsuchiya	Masaaki Iwane & Izumi Shimura	June 7, 2024	January 13, 2025 (UK); February 7, 2025 (US)
1288	1277	9	"The Treasure of Eternity (The Eternal Blessing)"; Transliteration: "Towa no Megumi" (Japanese: 永遠のめぐみ)	Directed by : Yūichi Abe; Storyboarded by : Noriaki Saitō	Kureha Matsuzawa	Yoshitaka Yanagihara & Masaya Ōnishi	June 14, 2024	January 13, 2025 (UK); February 7, 2025 (US)
1289	1278	10	"Showdown! The Paldea Elite Four (Confrontation! The Big Four of Paldea)"; Transliteration: "Taiketsu! Parudea Shiten'ou" (Japanese: 対決！パルデア四天王)	Directed by : Yoshihiko Iwata; Storyboarded by : Hiromasa Amano	Naruki Nagakawa	Chiaki Kurakazu, Natsumi Hattori & Megumi Matsumoto	June 21, 2024	January 13, 2025 (UK); February 7, 2025 (US)
1290	1279	11	"Liko vs. Rika! Towards the Battle's End (Liko VS Chili! Beyond the Battle)"; Transliteration: "Riko VS Chiri! Batoru no Saki ni" (Japanese: リコVSチリ！バトルの先に)	Directed by : Makoto Nakata; Storyboarded by : Makoto Nakata	Naruki Nagakawa	Keita Hagiwara and Yusuke Oshida	June 28, 2024	January 13, 2025 (UK); February 7, 2025 (US)
1291	1280	12	"The Terapagos I Don't Know (A Terapagos I Don't Know)"; Transliteration: "Watashi no Shiranai Terapagosu" (Japanese: わたしの知らないテラパゴス)	Directed by : Hiromichi Matano; Storyboarded by : Yūji Asada	Kureha Matsuzawa	Makoto Shinjō & Rie Eyama	July 5, 2024	February 17, 2025 (UK); April 25, 2025 (US)
1292	1281	13	"Food Fit for a Kingambit! (The Signature Pokémon is Dodogezan!?)"; Transliteration: "Kanban Pokemon wa Dodogezan!?" (Japanese: 看板ポケモンはドドゲザン！？)	Yasuhiro Noda	Deko Akao	Toshiko Nakaya, Megumi Matsumoto & Kenji Katō	July 12, 2024	February 17, 2025 (UK); April 25, 2025 (US)
1293	1282	14	"Dance, Quaxly! The Blue Medali Step! (Dance, Kuwassu! Blue Champion Steps!!)"; Transliteration: "Odore Kuwassu! Aoiki Chanpuru Suteppu!!" (Japanese: おどれクワッス！碧きチャンプルステップ！！)	Directed by : Fumihiro Ueno; Storyboarded by : Hiromasa Amano	Naohiro Fukushima	Takashi Shinohara	July 26, 2024	February 17, 2025 (UK); April 25, 2025 (US)
1294	1283	15	"Roy and Fuecoco's First Snow! (The First Snow! Ho Ho Ga!!)"; Transliteration: "Hajimete no Yuki! Hohhoggee!!" (Japanese: はじめての雪！ホッホッゲー！！)	Directed by : Yoshihiko Iwata; Storyboarded by : Satoru Iriyoshi	Kimiko Ueno	Hiromi Sakai, Yoshitaka Yanagihara, Kenji Katō, Masaya Ōnishi, Toshinari Abe & Hiromi Niioka	August 9, 2024	February 17, 2025 (UK); April 25, 2025 (US)
1295	1284	16	"Resonating Spirits in a Challenge to Ryme! (Let Your Soul Resonate! A Challenge to Rime)"; Transliteration: "Hibike Tamashii! Raimu e no Chousen" (Japanese: 響け魂！ライムへの挑戦)	Directed by : Yoshihiko Iwata; Storyboarded by : Satoru Iriyoshi	Michihiro Tsuchiya	Keita Hagiwara, Chiaki Kurakazu, Natsumi Hattori & Toshinari Abe	August 16, 2024	February 17, 2025 (UK); April 25, 2025 (US)
1296	1285	17	"A New Song for Fuecoco (Me and Hogator's Song)"; Transliteration: "Hogēta to Boku no Uta" (Japanese: ホゲータとぼくの歌)	Yūji Asada	Michihiro Tsuchiya	Masaaki Iwane & Izumi Shimura	August 23, 2024	February 17, 2025 (UK); April 25, 2025 (US)
1297	1286	18	"Ice Battle! Cold-Eyed Grusha (Battle of Ice! The Cold-Eyed Grusha)"; Transliteration: "Koori no Tatakai! Tsumetai Hitomi no Guruusha" (Japanese: 氷の戦い！冷たい瞳のグルーシャ)	Ayumi Moriyama	Naohiro Fukushima	Kenji Katō, Yusuke Oshida, Megumi Matsumoto, Toshiko Nakaya & Hiromi Niioka	August 30, 2024	February 17, 2025 (UK); April 25, 2025 (US)
1298	1287	19	"The Approaching Shadow! (Mount Napper, the Creeping Shadow)"; Transliteration: "Nappe Yama, Shinobiyoru Kage" (Japanese: ナッペ山、しのびよる影)	Hiromichi Matano; Storyboarded by : Hiromasa Amano	Kureha Matsuzawa	Makoto Shinjō & Rie Eyama	September 6, 2024	February 17, 2025 (UK); April 25, 2025 (US)
1299	1288	20	"Liko and Amethio (Liko and Amethio)"; Transliteration: "Riko to Amejio" (Japanese: リコとアメジオ)	Makoto Nakata	Kureha Matsuzawa	Koki Yanagihara, Keita Hagiwara & Masaya Ōnishi	September 13, 2024	February 17, 2025 (UK); April 25, 2025 (US)
1300	1289	21	"Infiltrating the System! Naranja Academy in Danger! (System Invasion! Crisis at Orange Academy!!)"; Transliteration: "Shisutemu Shin'nyū! Orenji Akademī no Kiki!!" (Japanese: システム侵入！オレンジアカデミーの危機！！)	Kenya Kodama; Storyboarded by : Shōji Nishida	Naruki Nagakawa	Masashi Ōtsuka, Mari Kobayashi, Reina Ono & Yukie Sasaki	September 20, 2024	February 17, 2025 (UK); April 25, 2025 (US)
1301	1290	22	"Shine on, Terastallization! Liko vs. Roy! (Shine Terastal! Liko VS Roy!!)"; Transliteration: "Kagayake Terasutaru! Riko VS Roi!!" (Japanese: 輝けテラスタル！リコVSロイ！！)	Directed by : Yūichi Abe; Storyboarded by : Mio Hidenin	Naruki Nagakawa	Yusuke Oshida, Chiaki Kurakazu & Natsumi Hattori	September 27, 2024	February 17, 2025 (UK); April 25, 2025 (US)
1302	1291	23	"Into a New Sky! The Brave Olivine! (To a New Sky! Brave Asagi!!)"; Transliteration: "Aratanaru Sora e! Bureibu Asagi-gō!!" (Japanese: 新たなる空へ！ブレイブアサギ号！！)	Directed by : Fumihiro Ueno; Storyboarded by : Hiromasa Amano	Kureha Matsuzawa	Takashi Shinohara	October 11, 2024	April 30, 2025 (AUS); June 27, 2025 (US)
1303	1292	24	"Roy is Crocalor, and Crocalor is Roy! (I'm a Pokémon and You're Me!?)"; Transliteration: "Boku ga Pokemon de, Kimi ga Boku!?" (Japanese: ぼくがポケモンで、キミがぼく！？)	Yoshihiko Iwata	Deko Akao	Masaya Ōnishi, Yūhei Takaboshi, Yoshitaka Yanagihara, Hiromi Niioka & Toshiko Nakaya	October 18, 2024	May 1, 2025 (AUS); June 27, 2025 (US)
1304	1293	25	"Tinkatink's Hammer Wasn't Made in a Day (Kanuchan's Hammer Wasn't Made in a Day)"; Transliteration: "Kanuchan no Hanmā wa 1-nichi ni Shite Narazu" (Japanese: カヌチャンのハンマーは1日にしてならず)	Yūji Asada	Kimiko Ueno	Masaaki Iwane & Izumi Shimura	October 25, 2024	May 2, 2025 (AUS); June 27, 2025 (US)
1305	1294	26	"Encounters at the Crystal Pool (Encounter at the Illuminating Pool)"; Transliteration: "Terasu Ike no Deai" (Japanese: てらす池の出会い)	Directed by : Yoshihisa Matsumoto; Storyboarded by : Shōji Nishida	Dai Satō	Masumi Hattori	November 1, 2024	May 5, 2025 (AUS); June 27, 2025 (US)
1306	1295	27	"The Search for Kleavor! (Pursuit! The Search for Basagiri!!)"; Transliteration: "Tsuiseki! Basagiri o Sagase!!" (Japanese: 追跡！バサギリを探せ！！)	Directed by : Hiromichi Matano; Storyboarded by : Satoru Iriyoshi	Michihiro Tsuchiya	Makoto Shinjō & Rie Eyama	November 8, 2024	May 6, 2025 (AUS); June 27, 2025 (US)
1307	1296	28	"Kleavor the Solitary Warrior (Basagiri the Lone Warrior)"; Transliteration: "Kokō no Senshi Basagiri" (Japanese: 孤高の戦士バサギリ)	Ayumi Moriyama	Michihiro Tsuchiya	Keita Hagiwara, Natsumi Hattori, Toshinari Abe, Izumi Shimura & Yūki Kitajima	November 15, 2024	May 7, 2025 (AUS); June 27, 2025 (US)
1308	1297	29	"The Three Explorers (The Three Explorers)"; Transliteration: "San-nin no Ekkusupurōrāzu" (Japanese: 3人のエクスプローラーズ)	Directed by : Tsurugi Harada; Storyboarded by : Hiromasa Amano	Kureha Matsuzawa	Yōsuke Toyama & Katsuji Matsumoto	November 22, 2024	May 8, 2025 (AUS); June 27, 2025 (US)
1309	1298	30	"The Wonders of the World! (The Entrusted Future, the Shine of This World)"; Transliteration: "Takusareta Mirai, Kono Sekai no Kagayaki" (Japanese: 託された未来、この世界の輝き)	Directed by : Makoto Nakata; Storyboarded by : Makoto Nakata & Saori Den	Kureha Matsuzawa	Yoshitaka Yanagihara, Megumi Matsumoto & Masaya Ōnishi	November 29, 2024	May 9, 2025 (AUS); June 27, 2025 (US)
1310	1299	31	"Wynaut?! Wy-Yes! (Sohnano? Sohdayo!)"; Transliteration: "Sō nano? Sohdayo!" (Japanese: ソーナノ？ソーダヨ！)	Yūji Asada	Naohiro Fukushima	Masaaki Iwane & Izumi Shimura	December 6, 2024	May 12, 2025 (UK); June 27, 2025 (US)
1311	1300	32	"Ludlow's Homecoming! (Randou Returns to His Hometown)"; Transliteration: "Randō, Kokyō e Kaeru" (Japanese: ランドウ、故郷へ帰る)	Directed by : Fumihiro Ueno; Storyboarded by : Hiromasa Amano	Kimiko Ueno	Wu Xiaolai, Toshinari Abe, Toshiko Nakatani & Takeshi Kobayashi	December 13, 2024	May 12, 2025 (UK); June 27, 2025 (US)
1312	1301	33	"Entei's Fierce Battle Cry! (A Fierce Fight Against Entei! The Noble Roar of Flame!!)"; Transliteration: "Gekitō Entei! Honō no Otakebi!!" (Japanese: 激闘エンテイ！炎のおたけび！！)	Directed by : Yoshihiko Iwata; Storyboarded by : Noriaki Saitō	Naruki Nagakawa	Natsumi Hattori, Keita Hagiwara, Yūhei Takaboshi & Hiromi Sakai	December 20, 2024	May 12, 2025 (UK); June 27, 2025 (US)
1313	1302	34	"Over the Top"; Transliteration: "Ōbā za Toppu" (Japanese: オーバー・ザ・トップ)	Directed by : Ayae Shinkai; Storyboarded by : Shōji Nishida	Dai Satō	Yusuke Oshida, Megumi Matsumoto & Megumi Niioka	January 10, 2025	July 17, 2025 (UK); September 26, 2025 (US)
1314	1303	35	"Total-lie Awesome Pokémon in Area Zero?! (Totally Awesome Pokémon in Area Zero?!)"; Transliteration: "Eria Zero de Oniike Pokemon!?" (Japanese: エリアゼロでオニイケポケモン！？)	Directed by : Hiromichi Matano; Storyboarded by : Hiromasa Amano	Deko Akao	Hiromichi Matano, Makoto Shinjō & Rie Eyama	January 17, 2025	July 17, 2025 (UK); September 26, 2025 (US)
1315	1304	36	"The Pillar of Fire (A Grand Battle! Earth-Gouging Fire)"; Transliteration: "Dai Batoru! Daichi o Ugatsu Honō" (Japanese: 大バトル！大地を穿つ炎)	Directed by : Kyōhei Sumiyama; Storyboarded by : Makoto Nakata	Michihiro Tsuchiya	Yoshitaka Yanagihara, Masaya Ōnishi & Toshinari Abe	January 24, 2025	July 17, 2025 (UK); September 26, 2025 (US)
1316	1305	37	"Beyond the Shining Rainbow (At the End of the Shining Rainbow)"; Transliteration: "Hikari Dashita Niji no Saki de" (Japanese: 光り出した虹の先で)	Yūji Asada	Kureha Matsuzawa	Masaaki Iwane & Izumi Shimura	January 31, 2025	July 17, 2025 (UK); September 26, 2025 (US)
1317	1306	38	"The Truth Revealed! (The Truth Revealed? Amethio's Resolve!)"; Transliteration: "Akasareru Shinjitsu? Amejio no Ketsui!" (Japanese: 明かされる真実？アメジオの決意！)	Ayumi Moriyama	Kureha Matsuzawa	Keita Hagiwara, Natsumi Hattori, Toshiko Nakaya, Hiromi Sakai & Yoshitaka Yanagihara	February 7, 2025	July 17, 2025 (UK); September 26, 2025 (US)
1318	1307	39	"Where the Land Meets the Sky (The Place Where Heaven and Earth Meet)"; Transliteration: "Ten to Chi ga Deau Tokoro" (Japanese: 天と地が出会う処)	Directed by : Yoshihiko Iwata; Storyboarded by : Satoru Iriyoshi	Naohiro Fukushima	Masumi Hattori	February 14, 2025	July 17, 2025 (UK); September 26, 2025 (US)
1319	1308	40	"The Pokémon Paradise of Laqua! (Arrival! The Paradise of Rakua)"; Transliteration: "Tōchaku! Rakuen Rakua" (Japanese: 到着！楽園ラクア)	Directed by : Fumihiro Ueno; Storyboarded by : Noriaki Saitō	Kureha Matsuzawa	Tatsuya Oka, Azusa Nishimura & Takeshi Kobayashi	February 21, 2025	July 17, 2025 (UK); September 26, 2025 (US)
1320	1309	41	"The Rising Volt Tacklers vs. The Explorers! (The Rising Volteccers VS The Explorers!)"; Transliteration: "Raijingu Borutekkāzu VS Ekusupurōrāzu!" (Japanese: ライジングボルテッカーズVSエクスプローラーズ！)	Makoto Nakata	Kureha Matsuzawa	Yoshitaka Yanagihara, Megumi Matsumoto & Masaya Ōnishi	February 28, 2025	July 17, 2025 (UK); September 26, 2025 (US)
1321	1310	42	"Guided by the Black Rayquaza! (The Guidance of the Black Rayquaza)"; Transliteration: "Kuroi Rekkuuza no Michibiki" (Japanese: 黒いレックウザの導き)	Directed by : Kenya Kodama; Storyboarded by : Hiromasa Amano	Kureha Matsuzawa	Miki Ueda, Masashi Ōtsuka, Kei Takahashi, Anri Ikumi, Yukie Sasaki, Mari Kobayashi & Takaaki Sonoda	March 7, 2025	July 17, 2025 (UK); September 26, 2025 (US)
1322	1311	43	"The Earthshaking White Zygarde (The White Zygarde Causes Shock Waves)"; Transliteration: "Gekishin no Shiroi Zygarde" (Japanese: 激震の白いジガルデ)	Hiroaki Takagi	Kureha Matsuzawa	Yusuke Oshida, Toshinari Abe, Yūhei Takaboshi, Izumi Shimura, Megumi Matsumoto & Masaya Ōnishi	March 14, 2025	July 17, 2025 (UK); September 26, 2025 (US)
1323	1312	44	"Where the Adventure Leads (Beyond the Adventure)"; Transliteration: "Bōken no Saki ni" (Japanese: 冒険の先に)	Kyohei Sumiyama	Kureha Matsuzawa	Keita Hagiwara, Hattori Natsumi, Shinjo Makoto, Rie Eyama & Erial	March 21, 2025	July 17, 2025 (UK); September 26, 2025 (US)

=== Season 28: Horizons — Rising Hope (2025–2026) ===
Jap. overall	Eng. overall	No. in season	English title Japanese title	Directed by	Written by	Animation directed by	Original release date	English release date
1324	1313	1	"Eyes to the Skies Once Again, Part 1 (To the Skies Once More, Part 1)"; Transliteration: "Ōzora e Mukatte, Futatabi Zenpen" (Japanese: 大空へ向かって、再び前編)	Ayumi Moriyama	Dai Satō	Yoshitaka Yanagihara, Toshiko Nakaya, Hiromi Niioka, Masaya Onishi, Hattori Natsumi & Yusuke Oshida	April 11, 2025 (Note: These episodes were broadcast as part of an hour-long special.)	October 27, 2025 (UK); January 6, 2026 (US)
1325	1314	2	"Eyes to the Skies Once Again, Part 2 (To the Skies Once More, Part 2)"; Transliteration: "Ōzora e Mukatte, Futatabi Kōhen" (Japanese: 大空へ向かって、再び後編)	Masatsune Oi	Dai Satō	Yuki Kitajima, Kiah Chen, Brokerage, Lu Qing Yun, Kennedy Freeman, Imani Brown, Federico Iglesias, Park Song Hwa, Heo Jae Young, Park Ji-yun, Kim Jeong-woo & Noeko Kashiuchi	April 11, 2025	October 27, 2025 (UK); January 6, 2026 (US)
1326	1315	3	"Following Traces of Laquium (Follow the Rakurium Signs)"; Transliteration: "Rakuriumu Sain o Otte" (Japanese: ラクリウム・サインを追って)	Yūji Asada	Dai Satō	Masaaki Iwane & Izumi Shimura	April 18, 2025	October 27, 2025 (UK); January 6, 2026 (US)
1327	1316	4	"Clash of the Nidothing Fans! (Super-Stans?! A Gurumin Fan Battle!!)"; Transliteration: "Gachi Oshi!? Gurumin Fan Taiketsu!!"" (Japanese: ガチ推し！？ぐるみんファン対決！！)	Directed by : Chiko Ueda; Storyboarded by : Hiromasa Amano	Kureha Matsuzawa	Yusuke Oshida & Toshinari Abe	April 25, 2025	October 27, 2025 (UK); January 6, 2026 (US)
1328	1317	5	"The Pokémon Center Lady"; Transliteration: "Pokémon Center no Oneesan" (Japanese: ポケモンセンターのお姉さん)	Directed by : Yasuhiro Noda; Storyboarded by : Yūji Asada & Ichizō Kobayashi	Kureha Matsuzawa	Keita Hagiwara, Natsumi Hattori, Yumi Sakai, Megumi Matsumoto, Izumi Shimura, Lu Laforte & A-Real	May 2, 2025	October 27, 2025 (UK); January 6, 2026 (US)
1329	1318	6	"The Strong Sphere"; Transliteration: "Strong Sphere" (Japanese: ストロングスフィア)	Directed by : Hiromichi Matano; Storyboarded by : Satoshi Shimizu	Naruki Nagakawa	Makoto Shinjō, Rie Eyama, Alliance & Sakuya Ave	May 9, 2025	October 27, 2025 (UK); January 6, 2026 (US)
1330	1319	7	"Crash! Team Dragon Rampage! (Clash! The Dragon Speed Gang)"; Transliteration: "Gekitotsu! Doragon Bakusōdan" (Japanese: 激突！ドラゴン爆走団)	Directed by : Yoshihiko Iwata; Storyboarded by : Hiromasa Amano	Kimiko Ueno	Kōki Yanagihara, Toshiko Nakaya, Masaya Ōnishi, Izumi Shimura & A-Real	May 16, 2025	October 27, 2025 (UK); January 6, 2026 (US)
1331	1320	8	"The Prankster (The Mischievous Maggyo's Lovely Smile?)"; Transliteration: "Itazura Maggyo no Ii Egao?" (Japanese: いたずらマッギョのイイ笑顔？)	Yūji Asada	Naohiro Fukushima	Masaaki Iwane & Izumi Shimura	May 30, 2025	October 27, 2025 (UK); January 6, 2026 (US)
1332	1321	9	"Reunion in Cortondo (Cercle Town, Site of Reunions!)"; Transliteration: "Saikai no Serukuru Taun!" (Japanese: 再会のセルクルタウン！)	Directed by : Yoshihiko Iwata; Storyboarded by : Suzu	Deko Akao	Yusuke Oshida, Toshinari Abe, Dong Li Ze, Shen Tao Yi, X10, Chen Liang, He Ye, Yu Hui Yun, Luo Rui, Ryōta Kurata, A-Real & Lu Laforte	June 6, 2025	October 27, 2025 (UK); January 6, 2026 (US)
1333	1322	10	"Orla, Grounded (A Flightless Orio and...)" Transliteration: "Tobenai Orio to" (Japanese: 飛べないオリオと)	Directed by : Hye Jin Seo; Storyboarded by : Ichizō Kobayashi	Kureha Matsuzawa	Jin Zhong	June 13, 2025	October 27, 2025 (UK); January 6, 2026 (US)
1334	1323	11	"We Are the Rising Volt Tacklers! (We Are the Rising Volteccers!)"; Transliteration: "Warera Raijingu Borutekkāzu!" (Japanese: 我らライジングボルテッカーズ！)	Kyōhei Sumiyama	Kureha Matsuzawa	Natsumi Hattori, Megumi Matsumoto & Yutsuko Hanai	June 20, 2025	October 27, 2025 (UK); January 6, 2026 (US)
1335	1324	12	"Terastallization vs. Mega Evolution! (Fight! Terastallization VS Mega Evolution!!)"; Transliteration: "Tatakae! Terasutaru tai Megashinka!!" (Japanese: 闘え！テラスタル対メガシンカ！！)	Directed by : Yasunori Gotō; Storyboarded by : Hiromasa Amano	Dai Satō	Kōki Yanagihara & Masaya Ōnishi	June 27, 2025	January 6, 2026 (US); February 27, 2026 (UK)
1336	1325	13	"The Knight in the Ruins (The Knight Encountered in the Ruins)"; Transliteration: "Iseki de Deatta Kishi" (Japanese: 遺跡で出逢った騎士)	Directed by : Chiko Ueta; Storyboarded by : Daigo Kinoshita	Dai Satō	Takashi Shinohara, Toshinari Abe, Natsumi Hattori, Yoshitaka Yanagihara, Lu Laforte & Revival	July 4, 2025	February 27, 2026 (UK); March 20, 2026 (US)
1337	1326	14	"Nidothing Love! (Stay Ablaze, My Love for Gurumin!)"; Transliteration: "Moyase, Gurumin Ai!" (Japanese: 燃やせ、ぐるみん愛！)	Yūji Asada	Naohiro Fukushima	Masaaki Iwane & Izumi Shimura	July 18, 2025	February 27, 2026 (UK); March 20, 2026 (US)
1338	1327	15	"Charcadet's Wish! (Carbon Wish)"; Transliteration: "Carbou no Negai" (Japanese: カルボウの願い)	Directed by : Yoshihiko Iwata, Makoto Nakata, Limthong Chidphong & Misu Yamaneko; Storyboarded by : Ichizō Kobayashi & Saori Den	Kureha Matsuzawa	Yusuke Oshida, Shūhei Yasuda, Masaya Ōnishi, Natsumi Hattori, Megumi Matsumoto, Yasue Ōno & A-Real	August 1, 2025	February 27, 2026 (UK); March 20, 2026 (US)
1339	1328	16	"Riding the Waves (Surfugo Goes Surfing After the Storm)"; Transliteration: "Arashi Nochi Naminori Sāfugō" (Japanese: 嵐のち波乗りサーフゴー)	Directed by : Hiromichi Matano; Storyboarded by : Hiroshi Aoyama	Kimiko Ueno	Makoto Shinjō, Rie Eyama & Yuki Masutani	August 8, 2025	February 27, 2026 (UK); March 20, 2026 (US)
1340	1329	17	"The Dusk Ball That Wouldn't Open (Mega Awesome?! The Off-Limits Dark Ball)"; Transliteration: "Mega Sugeē!? Akazu no Dāku Bōru" (Japanese: メガすげぇ！？開かずのダークボール)	Directed by : Yoshihiko Iwata; Storyboarded by : Yūko Kiyoshima	Deko Akao	Megumi Matsumoto, Natsumi Hattori & Masaya Ōnishi	August 15, 2025	February 27, 2026 (UK); March 20, 2026 (US)
1341	1330	18	"Friends as Two, Me and You (The Two of Us, As Friends)"; Transliteration: "Futari, Tomo to Shite" (Japanese: ふたり、友として)	Directed by : Misu Yamaneko; Storyboarded by : Mei Aratani, Yuri Isowa, Saori Den & Yusuke Oshida	Kureha Matsuzawa	Yusuke Oshida, Takashi Shinohara, Kenji Katō, Toshinari Abe & Nao Ikehara	August 22, 2025	February 27, 2026 (UK); March 20, 2026 (US)
1342	1331	19	"Taking the Next Steps (Diana Comes Back!!!!)"; Transliteration: "Daiana Kamuzu Bakku!!!!" (Japanese: ダイアナ・カムズ・バック！！！！)	Directed by : Chiko Ueta; Storyboarded by : Ichizō Kobayashi	Kureha Matsuzawa	Jin Zhong	August 29, 2025	February 27, 2026 (UK); March 20, 2026 (US)
1343	1332	20	"Tinkatuff's Hammer Wasn't Made in a Year! (How Nakanuchan Makes the Ultimate Hammer)"; Transliteration: "Nakanuchan, Saikyō Hanmā no Tsukurikata" (Japanese: ナカヌチャン、最強ハンマーの作り方)	Yūji Asada	Kimiko Ueno	Masaaki Iwane & Izumi Shimura	September 5, 2025	February 27, 2026 (UK); March 20, 2026 (US)
1344	1333	21	"The Six Heroes Unleashed! (The Six Heroes Bare Their Fangs)"; Transliteration: "Kiba o Muku Rokueiyū" (Japanese: 牙を剥く六英雄)	Directed by : Yoshihiko Iwata; Storyboarded by : Hiroshi Aoyama	Kureha Matsuzawa	Yoshitaka Yanagihara, Toshiko Nakaya, Yusuke Oshida & Megumi Matsumoto	September 12, 2025	February 27, 2026 (UK); March 20, 2026 (US)
1345	1334	22	"Better, Farther, Stronger! (Strive for Greater Heights with Unwavering Strength)"; Transliteration: "Tsuyoku, Takami o Mezashite" (Japanese: 強く、高みを目指して)	Directed by : Kyōhei Sumiyama; Storyboarded by : Hiromasa Amano	Kureha Matsuzawa	Hiromi Niioka, Toshinari Abe, Kenji Katō, Megumi Matsumoto & Toshiya Yamada	September 19, 2025	February 27, 2026 (UK); March 20, 2026 (US)
1346	1335	23	"Mega Evolution - Roy (Roy – Training)"; Transliteration: "Roi —— Shugyō" (Japanese: ロイ ——修行)	Directed by : Kyōhei Sumiyama; Storyboarded by : Satoru Iriyoshi	Kureha Matsuzawa	Yoshitaka Yanagihara & Hiromi Niioka	October 10, 2025	February 27, 2026 (UK); June 26, 2026 (US)
1347	1336	24	"Mega Evolution - Ult (Ult – Strongest)"; Transliteration: "Ult —— Saikyō" (Japanese: ウルト ——最強)	Directed by : Misu Yamaneko; Storyboarded by : Hiromasa Amano	Kureha Matsuzawa	Yasue Ōno & Natsumi Hattori	October 17, 2025	February 27, 2026 (UK); June 26, 2026 (US)
1348	1337	25	"Mega Evolution – Bonds"; Transliteration: "Mega Shinka —— Kizuna" (Japanese: メガシンカ ——絆)	Directed by : Makoto Nakata; Storyboarded by : Makoto Nakata	Kureha Matsuzawa	Shūhei Yasuda & Takashi Shinohara	October 24, 2025	February 27, 2026 (UK); June 26, 2026 (US)
1349	1338	26	"Welcome to Blueberry Academy! (Tera☆Sparkle! Blueberry Academy)"; Transliteration: "Tera☆Kira! Blueberry Gakuen" (Japanese: テラ☆キラ！ブルーベリー学園)	Directed by : Hiroyuki Okuno; Storyboarded by : Kentarō Tsubame	Dai Satō	Yoshitaka Yanagihara & Masaya Ōnishi	October 31, 2025	May 25, 2026 (UK); June 26, 2026 (US)
1350	1339	27	"Terarium Training! (Training Begins! Terarium Dome)"; Transliteration: "Shugyō Kaishi! Terariumu Dōmu" (Japanese: 修行開始！テラリウムドーム)	Directed by : Hiromichi Matano; Storyboarded by : Yuri Isowa & Moe Araya	Dai Satō	Makoto Shinjo, Rie Eyama & Yuki Masutani	November 7, 2025	May 25, 2026 (UK); June 26, 2026 (US)
1351	1340	28	"Ult-imate Training (Quiz Time! What is Ult's Training?)"; Transliteration: "Kuizu Desu! Ult No Shugyō Wa Nan Deshou?" (Japanese: クイズです！ウルトの修行はなんでしょう？)	Directed by : Misu Yamaneko; Storyboarded by : Hiroshi Aoyama	Naohiro Fukushima	Takashi Shinohara, Keita Hagiwara & Megumi Matsumoto	November 14, 2025	May 25, 2026 (UK); June 26, 2026 (US)
1352	1341	29	"Liko and Hattrem, Bonded by Happiness! (Liko and Tebrim - The Bond of Happiness!)"; Transliteration: "Riko To Teburimu, Shiawase No Kizuna!" (Japanese: リコとテブリム、幸せの絆！)	Directed by : Yōsuke Fujino; Storyboarded by : Hiromasa Amano	Deko Akao	Zhong Jin	November 21, 2025	May 25, 2026 (UK); June 26, 2026 (US)
1353	1342	30	"Don't Give Up, Crocalor! (Give it Your All, Crocalor - For the Sake of Tomorrow)"; Transliteration: "Funbare Achikēta, Ashita No Tame Ni" (Japanese: ふんばれアチケータ、明日のために)	Yūji Asada	Naruki Nagakawa	Masaaki Iwane & Izumi Shimura	November 28, 2025	May 25, 2026 (UK); June 26, 2026 (US)
1354	1343	31	"Dot and Penny's Top-Secret Mission! (Dot & Botan! A Top Secret Operation)"; Transliteration: "Dotto & Botan! Gokuhi Daisakusen" (Japanese: ドット&ボタン！極秘大作戦)	Directed by : Kyōhei Sumiyama; Storyboarded by : Daigo Kinoshita	Michihiro Tsuchiya	STUDIO MASSKET	December 5, 2025	May 25, 2026 (UK); June 26, 2026 (US)
1355	1344	32	"The Catcher in the Sky"; Transliteration: "Kyatchā In Za Sukai" (Japanese: キャッチャー・イン・ザ・スカイ)	Directed by : Makoto Nakata; Storyboarded by : Daiki Tomiyasu	Kureha Matsuzawa	Toshinari Abe, Yasue Ōno & Kenji Kato	December 12, 2025	May 25, 2026 (UK); June 26, 2026 (US)
1356	1345	33	"Roy vs. Friede: Wings of Fire! (Red-Hot Wings! Roy VS Friede)"; Transliteration: "Shakunetsu no Tsubasa! Roi VS Furiido" (Japanese: 灼熱の翼！ロイVSフリード)	Directed by : Yoshihiko Iwata; Storyboarded by : Shoji Nishida	Kureha Matsuzawa	Hiromi Niioka, Yoshitaka Yanagihara, Masaya Ōnishi & Megumi Matsumoto	December 19, 2025	May 25, 2026 (UK); June 26, 2026 (US)
1357	1346	34	"Mochi Mayhem! (Shock and Horrors! Kibikibi Panic on the Ship)"; Transliteration: "Senritsu! Senjō no Kibikibi Panic" (Japanese: 戦慄！ 船上のキビキビパニック)	Chiko Ueta	Kimiko Ueno	Yuki Masutani, Megumi Matsumoto & X10	January 9, 2026	May 25, 2026 (UK); June 26, 2026 (US)
1358	1347	35	"Operation Infiltration! (Storming Explorers Headquarters!)"; Transliteration: "Totsunyū! Explorers Honbu" (Japanese: 突入！エクスプローラーズ本部)	Directed by : Michihiro Satō; Storyboarded by : Hiromasa Amano	Kureha Matsuzawa	Megumi Matsumoto & Toshiko Nakaya	January 23, 2026	July 20, 2026 (UK); September 18, 2026 (US)
1359	1348	36	"Battle for the Six Heroes! (Get Back the Six Heroes!)"; Transliteration: "Rokueiyū o Torimodose!" (Japanese: 六英雄を取り戻せ！)	Yūji Asada	Kureha Matsuzawa	Masaaki Iwane & Izumi Shimura	January 30, 2026	July 20, 2026 (UK); September 18, 2026 (US)
1360	1349	37	"Strong Bonds, Can't Lose! (A Battle We Can't Afford to Lose! Bonds Get Put to the Test!!)"; Transliteration: "Makerarenai Batoru! Tamesareru Kizuna!!" (Japanese: 負けられないバトル！試される絆！！)	Directed by : Yoshihiko Iwata; Storyboarded by : Yūko Kiyoshima	Naruki Nagakawa	N/A	February 6, 2026	July 20, 2026 (UK); September 18, 2026 (US)
1361	1350	38	"The Training Royale! (Intense Training! Everyone's Respective Feelings)"; Transliteration: "Ōtokkun! Sorezore no Omoi" (Japanese: 大特訓！それぞれの想い)	Directed by : Ryōtarō Aoba; Storyboarded by : Hiromasa Amano	Michihiro Tsuchiya	Ryōtarō Aoba, Kōsuke Hiramatsu, Ren Tanaka & Sana Sanada	February 13, 2026	July 20, 2026 (UK); September 18, 2026 (US)
1362	1351	39	"Dot and Quaxwell Step it Up! (Step By Step! Dot & Welkamo!!)"; Transliteration: "Suteppu Bai Suteppu! Dotto & Werukamo!!" (Japanese: ステップ・バイ・ステップ！ドット&ウェルカモ！！)	Directed by : Hiromichi Matano; Storyboarded by : Shōji Nishida	Naohiro Fukushima	Makoto Shinjō, Rie Eyama & Yuki Masutani	February 20, 2026	July 20, 2026 (UK); September 18, 2026 (US)
1363	1352	40	"Destiny of the Black Rayquaza (The Time Has Come for the Showdown with the Black Rayquaza)"; Transliteration: "Kuroi Rekkuuza, Kecchaku no Toki" (Japanese: 黒いレックウザ、決着の時)	Directed by : Kyōhei Sumiyama; Storyboarded by : Hiromasa Amano	Kimiko Ueno	Takashi Shinohara, Natsumi Hattori, Toshinari Abe, Yusuke Oshida, Tomoki Ogawa & Yūki Hijikata	February 27, 2026	July 20, 2026 (UK); September 18, 2026 (US)
1364	1353	41	"Hamber's Moonlight Battle (Hambel on the Night of the Blood Moon)"; Transliteration: "Akai Tsukiyo no Hanberu" (Japanese: 赤い月夜のハンベル)	Misu Yamaneko	Kureha Matsuzawa	Kōki Yanagihara, Masaya Ōnishi, Kenji Katō, Yusuke Oshida, Toshinari Abe & Tomohiro Koyama	March 6, 2026	July 20, 2026 (UK); September 18, 2026 (US)
1365	1354	42	"A Surprise Reunion (The Time Has Come! Gather, Companions!)"; Transliteration: "Kitaru! Atsumaru! Nakamatachi" (Japanese: 来たる！集まる！仲間たち)	Directed by : Chiko Ueta; Storyboarded by : Shin'ichi Watanabe	Kureha Matsuzawa	Chiko Ueta, Toshiko Nakaya & Megumi Matsumoto	March 13, 2026	July 20, 2026 (UK); September 18, 2026 (US)
1366	1355	43	"Lucario's Challenge! (Rematch! A Challenge for Lucario!!)"; Transliteration: "Ribenji Matchi! Rukario no Chōsen!!" (Japanese: リベンジマッチ！ルカリオの挑戦！！)	Yūji Asada	Kureha Matsuzawa	Masaaki Iwane & Izumi Shimura	March 20, 2026	July 20, 2026 (UK); September 18, 2026 (US)
1367	1356	44	"The Final Battle Is Near (To the Final Battle)"; Transliteration: "Saigo no Tatakai e" (Japanese: 最後の戦いへ)	Directed by : Yōsuke Fujino; Storyboarded by : Yūko Kiyoshima	Kureha Matsuzawa	Kōki Yanagihara, Natsumi Hattori, Megumi Matsumoto, Keita Hagiwara & Toshinari Abe	April 10, 2026	July 20, 2026 (UK); September 18, 2026 (US)
1368	1357	45	"One Step Closer (The Ultimate Showdown! Mega Evolution!!)"; Transliteration: "Chōjō Kessen! Megashinka!!" (Japanese: 頂上決戦！メガシンカ!！)	Directed by : Yoshihiko Iwata; Storyboarded by : Hiromasa Amano	Kureha Matsuzawa	Takashi Shinohara, Hiromi Niioka & Yuki Masutani	April 17, 2026	July 20, 2026 (UK); September 18, 2026 (US)
1369	1358	46	"The Core Awakens (Awakening! The Catastrophic Rakurium Core)"; Transliteration: "Kakusei! Horobi no Rakuriumu Koa" (Japanese: 覚醒！滅びのラクリウム・コア)	Directed by : Hiroaki Takagi; Storyboarded by : Satoru Iriyoshi & Yusuke Oshida	Kureha Matsuzawa	Yusuke Oshida, Yuzuko Hanai, Masaya Ōnishi, Yasue Ōno, Toshinari Abe & Izumi Shimura	April 24, 2026	July 20, 2026 (UK); September 18, 2026 (US)
1370	1359	47	"Stellar Finale"; Transliteration: "Sutera Fināre" (Japanese: ステラ・フィナーレ)	Directed by : Saori Den & Kyōhei Sumiyama; Storyboarded by : Saori Den	Kureha Matsuzawa	Kōki Yanagihara, Natsumi Hattori, Megumi Matsumoto, Izumi Shimura, Masaya Ōnishi, Kenji Katō, Takashi Shinohara & Keita Hagiwara	May 1, 2026	July 20, 2026 (UK); September 18, 2026 (US)

=== Season 29: Horizons — Wonders Ahead (2026) ===
Jap. overall	Eng. overall	No. in season	English title Japanese title	Directed by	Written by	Animation directed by	Original release date	English release date
1371	TBA	1	"Reboot! Off to the World of Adventure!!"; Transliteration: "Ribūto! Bōken no Sekai e!!" (Japanese: リブート！冒険の世界へ！！)	Yūji Asada	Kureha Matsuzawa	Masaaki Iwane & Izumi Shimura	May 22, 2026	February 27, 2027 (US)
1372	TBA	2	"Enter the Fake Rising Volt Tacklers?!"; Transliteration: "Nise Raijingu Borutekkāzu Tōjō!!" (Japanese: 偽ライジングボルテッカーズ登場！？)	Directed by : Satoshi Takatō; Storyboarded by : Hiromasa Amano	Kureha Matsuzawa	Hiromi Niioka & Yuki Masutani	May 29, 2026	TBA
1373	TBA	3	"The Secret Metamon Rhapsody"; Transliteration: "Naisho no Metamon Kyōshikyoku" (Japanese: ないしょのメタモン狂詩曲)	Directed by : Hiroyuki Okuno; Storyboarded by : Kentarō Tsubame	Deko Akao	Kōsuke Hiramatsu, Nozomi Sekikawa, Zearth Sato, Kōki Yanagihara & Toshinari Abe	June 5, 2026	TBA
1374	TBA	4	"Clap Clap Clap! Mini-Gurumin!!"; Transliteration: "Pan Pan Pan! Mini Gurumin!!" (Japanese: パンパンパン！ミニぐるみん！！)	Directed by : Michihiro Satō; Storyboarded by : Yūko Kiyoshima	Kimiko Ueno	Ye He & Jingguo Wang	June 12, 2026	TBA
1375	TBA	5	"Ready Go! Unite Battle!!"; Transliteration: "READY GO! Unite Battle!!" (Japanese: READY GO！ユナイトバトル！！)	Yūji Asada	Michihiro Tsuchiya	Masaaki Iwane & Izumi Shimura	June 19, 2026	TBA
1376	TBA	6	"Miare City! New Encounters"; Transliteration: "Miare City! Arata na Deai" (Japanese: ミアレシティ！新たな出会い)	Directed by : Hiromichi Matano; Storyboarded by : Hiromasa Amano	Dai Satō	Makoto Shinjō, Rie Eyama & Yuki Masutani	July 3, 2026	TBA
1377	TBA	7	"A Dream Ball for You!"; Transliteration: "Dorīmu Bōru o Kimi ni!" (Japanese: ドリームボールをキミに！)	Chiko Ueta	Dai Satō	Kōki Yanagihara, Masaya Ōnishi, Kenji Katō, Mina Ōtaka & Tomoki Ogawa	July 17, 2026	TBA
1378	TBA	8	"Navi's Little Big Adventure!"; Transliteration: "Navi no Chiisana Daibōken!" (Japanese: ナヴィの小さな大冒険！)	Directed by : Rika Mashiko; Storyboarded by : Yūko Kiyoshima	Kureha Matsuzawa	Kōki Yanagihara, Natsumi Hattori & Mina Ōtaka	July 31, 2026	TBA
1379	TBA	9	"It's Astonishing! Mega Rayquaza and the Mystical Land?!"; Transliteration: "Kyōgaku! Mega Rekkuza to Shinpi no Chi!?" (Japanese: 驚愕！メガレックウザと神秘の地！？)	Jirō Arimoto	Naohiro Fukushima	Natsumi Hattori, Toshinari Abe & Hiromi Niioka	August 14, 2026	TBA
1380	TBA	10	"Wanival and Dekanuchan's Operation: Sleep!"; Transliteration: "Wēnibaru to Dekanuchan, Surīpu Daisakusen!" (Japanese: ウェーニバルとデカヌチャン、スリープ大作戦！)	Directed by : Ayae Shinkai; Storyboarded by : Kentarō Tsubame	Kimiko Ueno	Yuzuko Hanai & Kana Fujishiro	August 21, 2026	TBA
1381	TBA	11	"Right in the Feels! Why, It's a Pokémon Contest!!"; Transliteration: "Geki Emo! Pokémon Kontesuto Zamasu!!" (Japanese: 激エモ！ポケモンコンテストざます！！)	Directed by : Misu Yamaneko; Storyboarded by : Noriaki Saitō	Naruki Nagakawa	STUDIO MASSKET	August 28, 2026	TBA
1382	TBA	12	"Koraidon & Miraidon! The Great Race in Paldea"; Transliteration: "Koraidon & Miraidon! Paldea Dai Rēsu" (Japanese: コライドン＆ミライドン！ パルデア大レース)	Directed by : Akihiko Ōta & Studio PaTHoS; Storyboarded by : Masato Satō & Makoto Nakata	Daiki Tomiyasu	Kōki Yanagihara, Masaya Ōnishi, Toshiko Nakaya, Natsumi Hattori & A-Real	September 4, 2026	TBA
1383	TBA	13	"A Squishy Pokémon! If You Squish It and It Squishes, It's Squishy Time"; Transliteration: "Puni Puni Pokémon! Puniru Punireba Puniru Toki" (Japanese: プニプニポケモン！プニるプニればプニる時)	Yūji Asada	Deko Akao	Masaaki Iwane & Izumi Shimura	September 11, 2026	TBA
1384	TBA	14	"The Expanding World, GO with You!"; Transliteration: "Hirogaru Sekai, Kimi to GO!" (Japanese: 広がる世界、キミとＧＯ！)	Kyōhei Sumiyama	Kureha Matsuzawa	Kōki Yanagihara, Kenji Katō & Natsumi Hattori	September 18, 2026	TBA
1385	TBA	15	"Navi and the Mysterious Masked Child"; Transliteration: "Navi to Fushigi na Kamen no Ko" (Japanese: ナヴィと不思議な仮面の子)	Directed by : Makoto Nakata; Storyboarded by : Daiki Tomiyasu	Dai Satō	TBA	September 25, 2026	TBA
1386	TBA	16	"The Revered Companions Strike! Momowarou's Decision!!"; Transliteration: "Tomokko Shūrai! Momowarou no Ketsudan!!" (Japanese: ともっこ襲来！モモワロウの決断！！)	TBA	TBA	TBA	October 9, 2026	TBA

== Home media releases ==
=== DVD ===
Box Sets (USA, Region 1) [VIZ Media]
Volume			Episodes	Release date	Ref.
Season 20: Sun & Moon (2016–17)	The Complete Collection		942–984	November 6, 2018	
Season 21: Sun & Moon - Ultra Adventures (2017–18)	The Complete Collection		985–1004, 1006–1033	May 21, 2019	
Season 22: Sun & Moon - Ultra Legends (2018–19)	Volume Sets	The Last Grand Trial	1034–1051	September 8, 2020	
Season 22: Sun & Moon - Ultra Legends (2018–19)	Volume Sets	The Alola League Begins!	1052–1069	January 12, 2021	
Season 22: Sun & Moon - Ultra Legends (2018–19)	Volume Sets	The First Alola League Champion	1070–1087	May 4, 2021	
Season 22: Sun & Moon - Ultra Legends (2018–19)	The Complete Season		1034–1087	May 27, 2025	
Season 23: Journeys (2019–20)	Volume Sets	The Journey Starts Today!	1088–1103	January 11, 2022	
Season 23: Journeys (2019–20)	Volume Sets	Destination: Coronation!	1104–1119	April 5, 2022	
Season 23: Journeys (2019–20)	Volume Sets	Legends of Galar	1120–1135	July 12, 2022	
Season 23: Journeys (2019–20)	The Complete Season		1088–1135	July 22, 2025	
Season 24: Master Journeys (2020–21)	The Complete Season		1136–1177	May 23, 2023	
Season 25: Ultimate Journeys (2021–23)	The Complete Season		1178–1205, 1207, 1209–1212, 1214, 1216–1234, SP–15	July 23, 2024	
