= List of Pokémon episodes (seasons 10–19) =

Pokémon, known in Japan as Pocket Monsters (ポケットモンスター, Poketto Monsutā), is a Japanese anime television series produced by animation studio OLM for TV Tokyo. It is adapted from the Pokémon video game series published by Nintendo. The series originally follows the ten-year-old Pokémon Trainer and aspiring Pokémon Master Ash Ketchum (Note: Ash is voiced in English by Sarah Natochenny from season 9 onwards. His voice actor in Japanese is Rica Matsumoto.) and his adventures with his Electric-type Pokémon partner Pikachu (voiced by Ikue Ōtani), and a varying group of friends.

For the purposes of this list, the division between seasons of Pokémon is based on the season divisions used by The Pokémon Company International for the English dub. The English episode numbers are based on their first airing either in syndication, on Kids' WB, Cartoon Network, Disney XD or Netflix. Subsequent episodes of the English version follow the original Japanese order, except where banned episodes are shown.

== Series overview ==
Season	Season name	Episodes	Originally released	
Season	Season name	Episodes	First released	Last released
1	Indigo League	80	April 1, 1997	January 21, 1999
2	Adventures in the Orange Islands	36	January 28, 1999	October 7, 1999
3	The Johto Journeys	41	October 14, 1999	July 27, 2000
4	Johto League Champions	52	August 3, 2000	August 2, 2001
5	Master Quest	64	August 9, 2001	November 14, 2002
6	Advanced	40	November 21, 2002	August 28, 2003
7	Advanced Challenge	52	September 4, 2003	September 2, 2004
8	Advanced Battle	52	September 9, 2004	September 29, 2005
9	Battle Frontier	47	October 6, 2005	September 14, 2006
10	Diamond and Pearl	51	September 28, 2006	October 25, 2007
11	Diamond and Pearl: Battle Dimension	52	November 8, 2007	December 4, 2008
12	Diamond and Pearl: Galactic Battles	52	December 4, 2008	December 24, 2009
13	Diamond and Pearl: Sinnoh League Victors	34	January 7, 2010	September 9, 2010
14	Black & White	48	September 23, 2010	September 15, 2011
15	Black & White: Rival Destinies	49	September 22, 2011	October 4, 2012
16	Black & White: Adventures in Unova and Beyond	45	October 11, 2012	September 26, 2013
17	XY	48	October 17, 2013	October 30, 2014
18	XY: Kalos Quest	45	November 13, 2014	October 22, 2015
19	XYZ	48	October 29, 2015	October 27, 2016
20	Sun & Moon	43	November 17, 2016	September 21, 2017
21	Sun & Moon: Ultra Adventures	48	October 5, 2017	October 14, 2018
22	Sun & Moon: Ultra Legends	54	October 21, 2018	November 3, 2019
23	Journeys	48	November 17, 2019	December 4, 2020
24	Master Journeys	42	December 11, 2020	December 10, 2021
25	Ultimate Journeys	54	December 17, 2021	March 24, 2023
26	Horizons	45	April 14, 2023	March 29, 2024
27	Horizons – The Search for Laqua	44	April 12, 2024	March 21, 2025
28	Horizons – Rising Hope	47	April 11, 2025	May 1, 2026
29	Horizons – Wonders Ahead	16	May 22, 2026	TBA

== Episode list ==
=== Season 10: Diamond and Pearl (2006–07) ===
Jap. overall	Eng. overall	No. in season	English title Japanese title	Original release date	English air date
469	465	1	"Following a Maiden's Voyage!" (Setting Off! From Futaba Town to Masago Town!!); Transliteration: "Tabidachi! Futaba Taun Kara Masago Taun e!!" (Japanese: 旅立ち！フタバタウンからマサゴタウンへ！！)	September 28, 2006	April 20, 2007; June 4, 2007
470	466	2	"Two Degrees of Separation!" (Find Pikachu! Route 202!); Transliteration: "Pikachū o Sagase! 202-ban Dōro!" (Japanese: ピカチュウをさがせ！202番道路！)	September 28, 2006	April 20, 2007; June 5, 2007
471	467	3	"When Pokémon Worlds Collide!" (Rival Battle! Three On Three!!); Transliteration: "Raibaru Batoru! San Tai San!!" (Japanese: ライバルバトル！三対三！！)	September 28, 2006	April 20, 2007; June 6, 2007
472	468	4	"Dawn of a New Era!" (Pochama Against Subomie! Hikari's First Battle!!); Transliteration: "Potchama Tai Subomī! Hikari Hatsu Batoru!!" (Japanese: ポッチャマ対スボミー！ヒカリ初バトル！！)	October 5, 2006	June 7, 2007
473	469	5	"Gettin' Twiggy with It!" (Naetle! I Got It!); Transliteration: "Naetoru! Getto da ze!" (Japanese: ナエトル！ゲットだぜ！)	October 19, 2006	June 11, 2007
474	470	6	"Different Strokes for Different Blokes!" (Bewilder Forest! Shinji Returns!!); Transliteration: "Mayoi no Mori! Shinji Futatabi!!" (Japanese: 迷いの森！シンジふたたび！！)	October 26, 2006	June 12, 2007
475	471	7	"Like it or Lup It!" (Do Your Best, Pochama!!); Transliteration: "Potchama Ganbaru!!" (Japanese: ポッチャマがんばる！！)	November 2, 2006	June 13, 2007
476	472	8	"Gymbaliar!" (Gureggru of the Mysterious Gym!); Transliteration: "Nazo no Jimu no Guregguru!" (Japanese: なぞのジムのグレッグル！)	November 9, 2006	June 14, 2007
477	473	9	"Setting the World on its Buneary!" (Let's Play with Mimirol!?); Transliteration: "Mimiroru to Asobō!?" (Japanese: ミミロルとあそぼう！？)	November 16, 2006	June 18, 2007
478	474	10	"Not on My Watch Ya Don't!" (Can't Get the Pokétch!?); Transliteration: "Poketchi Nyūshu Konnan!?" (Japanese: ポケッチ入手困難！？)	November 30, 2006	June 19, 2007
479	475	11	"Mounting a Coordinator Assault!" (Hikari! Contest Debut!!); Transliteration: "Hikari! Kontesuto Debyū!!" (Japanese: ヒカリ！コンテストデビュー！！)	December 7, 2006	June 20, 2007
480	476	12	"Arrival of a Rival!" (Contest Battle! Rival Showdown!!); Transliteration: "Kontesuto Batoru! Raibaru Taiketsu!!" (Japanese: コンテストバトル！ライバル対決！！)	December 14, 2006	June 21, 2007
481	477	13	"A Staravia Is Born!" (Do Your Best, Mukkuru!); Transliteration: "Mukkuru Ganbaru!" (Japanese: ムックルがんばる！)	December 21, 2006 (Note: These episodes were broadcast as part of an hour-long special.)	June 25, 2007
482	478	14	"Leave it to Brocko!" (Leave it to Takeshi!); Transliteration: "Takeshi ni Omakase!" (Japanese: タケシにおまかせ！)	December 21, 2006	June 26, 2007
483	479	15	"Shapes of Things to Come!" (Kurogane Gym! Hyouta vs. Shinji!!); Transliteration: "Kurogane Jimu! Hyōta Tai Shinji!!" (Japanese: クロガネジム！ヒョウタVSシンジ！！)	January 11, 2007	June 27, 2007
484	480	16	"A Gruff Act to Follow!" (Zugaidos vs. Pikachu!); Transliteration: "Zugaidosu Tai Pikachū!" (Japanese: ズガイドスVSピカチュウ！)	January 18, 2007	June 28, 2007
485	481	17	"Wild in the Streets!" (Big Charge of Ancient Pokémon!!); Transliteration: "Kodai Pokemon Daishingeki!!" (Japanese: 古代ポケモン大進撃！！)	January 25, 2007	July 2, 2007
486	482	18	"O'er the Rampardos We Watched!" (Return to Kurogane Gym! Decisive Battle with Rampard!!); Transliteration: "Kurogane Jimu Futatabi! Kessen Ramuparudo!!" (Japanese: クロガネジムふたたび！決戦ラムパルド！！)	February 1, 2007	July 3, 2007
487	483	19	"Twice Smitten, Once Shy!" (Get Pachirisu... No Need to Worry!?); Transliteration: "Pachirisu Getto de...Daijōbu!?" (Japanese: パチリスゲットで…大丈夫！？)	February 8, 2007	July 5, 2007
488	484	20	"Mutiny in the Bounty!" (Pokémon Hunter J!); Transliteration: "Pokémon Hantā Jē!" (Japanese: ポケモンハンターJ！)	February 22, 2007	July 9, 2007
489	485	21	"Ya See We Want an Evolution!" (The Strongest Koiking and the Most Beautiful Hinbass!); Transliteration: "Saikyō no Koikingu to Mottomo Utsukushī Hinbasu!" (Japanese: 最強のコイキングと最も美しいヒンバス！)	March 1, 2007	July 10, 2007
490	486	22	"Borrowing on Bad Faith!" (Pachirisu vs. Eipom! Contest Battle!!); Transliteration: "Pachirisu Tai Eipamu! Kontesuto Batoru!!" (Japanese: パチリスVSエイパム！コンテストバトル！！)	March 8, 2007	July 11, 2007
491	487	23	"Faced with Steelix Determination!" (Roaring Haganeil! Protect the Bipper Village!!); Transliteration: "Bakusō Haganēru! Bippa no Mura o Mamore!!" (Japanese: 爆走ハガネール！ビッパの村を守れ！！)	March 15, 2007	July 12, 2007
492	488	24	"Cooking Up a Sweet Story!" (Showdown! Satoshi Against Pikachu!?); Transliteration: "Taiketsu! Satoshi Tai Pikachū!?" (Japanese: 対決！サトシ対ピカチュウ！？)	March 29, 2007	July 16, 2007
493	489	25	"Oh Do You Know the Poffin Plan!" (The Gifted Roserade and the Flower Legend!); Transliteration: "Kaiketsu Rozureido to Hana Densetsu!" (Japanese: 怪傑ロズレイドと花伝説！)	March 29, 2007	September 1, 2007
494	490	26	"Getting the Pre-Contest Titters!" (Pokémon Contest! Sonoo Tournament!!); Transliteration: "Pokemon Kontesuto! Sonō Taikai!!" (Japanese: ポケモンコンテスト！ソノオ大会！！)	April 5, 2007	September 1, 2007
495	491	27	"Settling a Not-So-Old Score!" (Decisive Battle! Pochama vs. Pottaishi!!); Transliteration: "Kessen! Potchama Tai Pottaishi!!" (Japanese: 決戦！ポッチャマVSポッタイシ！！)	April 5, 2007	September 8, 2007
496	492	28	"Drifloon on the Wind!" (Fuwante and the North Wind Messenger!); Transliteration: "Fuwante to Kitakaze no Tsukai!" (Japanese: フワンテと北風の使い！)	April 12, 2007	September 15, 2007
497	493	29	"The Champ Twins!" (Satoshi and Hikari! No Need to Worry in a Tag Battle!?); Transliteration: "Satoshi to Hikari! Taggu Batoru de Daijōbu!?" (Japanese: サトシとヒカリ！タッグバトルで大丈夫！？)	April 12, 2007	September 22, 2007
498	494	30	"Some Enchanted Sweetening!" (Hakutai Forest! Minomutchi Evolution Strategy!!); Transliteration: "Hakutai no Mori! Minomutchi Shinka Sakusen!!" (Japanese: ハクタイの森！ミノムッチ進化作戦！！)	April 19, 2007	September 29, 2007
499	495	31	"The Grass-Type is Always Greener!" (Naetle Against Naetle! Speed Showdown!!); Transliteration: "Naetoru Tai Naetoru! Supīdo Taiketsu!!" (Japanese: ナエトル対ナエトル！スピード対決！！)	April 26, 2007	October 6, 2007
500	496	32	"An Angry Combeenation!" (Beequeen of the Amber Castle!); Transliteration: "Kohaku no Shiro no Bīkuin!" (Japanese: 琥珀の城のビークイン！)	May 3, 2007	October 13, 2007
501	497	33	"All Dressed Up with Somewhere to Go!" (It's Love! Pokémon Transformation Tournament!!); Transliteration: "Suki Desu! Pokemon Narikiri Taikai!!" (Japanese: スキです！ポケモンなりきり大会！！)	May 10, 2007	October 20, 2007
502	498	34	"Buizel Your Way Out of This!" (Buoysel! Road to Being the Strongest!!); Transliteration: "Buizeru! Saikyō e no michi!" (Japanese: ブイゼル！最強への道！！)	May 17, 2007	October 27, 2007
503	499	35	"An Elite Meet and Greet!" (Elite Four Goyō and Dotakun!); Transliteration: "Shitennō Goyō to Dōtakun!" (Japanese: 四天王ゴヨウとドータクン！)	May 24, 2007	November 3, 2007
504	500	36	"A Secret Sphere of Influence!" (Sinnoh's Space-time Legend!); Transliteration: "Shin'ō Jikū Densetsu!" (Japanese: シンオウ時空伝説！)	May 31, 2007	November 10, 2007
505	501	37	"The Grass Menagerie!" (Hakutai Gym! Vs. Natane!!); Transliteration: "Hakutai Jimu! Tai Natane!!" (Japanese: ハクタイジム！VSナタネ！！)	June 7, 2007	November 17, 2007
506	502	38	"One Big Happiny Family!" (Explosive Birth! Cycling Road!!); Transliteration: "Bakutan! Saikuringu Rōdo!!" (Japanese: 爆誕！サイクリングロード！！)	June 21, 2007	November 24, 2007
507	503	39	"Steamboat Willies!" (Pikachu's Caretaking!); Transliteration: "Pikachū no Orusuban!" (Japanese: ピカチュウのおるすばん！)	July 5, 2007	December 1, 2007
508	504	40	"Top-Down Training!" (Champion – Shirona Appears!!); Transliteration: "Champion, Shirona Tōjō!!" (Japanese: チャンピオン・シロナ登場！！)	July 19, 2007	December 8, 2007
509	505	41	"A Stand-Up Sit-Down!" (Hikari, Nozomi and the Double Performance!!); Transliteration: "Hikari to Nozomi to Daburu Pafōmansu!!" (Japanese: ヒカリとノゾミとダブルパフォーマンス！！)	July 26, 2007	December 15, 2007
510	506	42	"The Electrike Company!" (Rakurai Practice Center!!); Transliteration: "Rakurai Kunren Sentā!!" (Japanese: ラクライ訓練センター！！)	August 9, 2007	December 22, 2007
511	507	43	"Malice in Wonderland!" (Mumage! Escape from the Nightmare!!); Transliteration: "Mūmāji! Akumu kara no Dasshutsu!!" (Japanese: ムウマージ！悪夢からの脱出！！)	August 16, 2007	December 29, 2007
512	508	44	"Mass Hip-Po-Sis!" (Save the Stray Hipopotas!); Transliteration: "Maigo no Hipopotasu o Tasukero!" (Japanese: 迷子のヒポポタスを助けろ！)	August 23, 2007	January 5, 2008
513	509	45	"Ill-Will Hunting!" (Hunter J Returns! Protect Tatetops!!); Transliteration: "Hantā Jē Futatabi! Tatetopusu o Mamore!!" (Japanese: ハンターJ再び！タテトプスを守れ！！)	August 30, 2007	January 12, 2008
514	510	46	"A Maze-ing Race!" (Shuffle in the Maze! Everyone Hustle!!); Transliteration: "Meiro de Shaffuru! Minna de Hassuru!!" (Japanese: 迷路でシャッフル！みんなでハッスル！！)	September 13, 2007	January 19, 2008
515	511	47	"Sandshrew's Locker!" (Miru, Casey and, Underwater!); Transliteration: "Miru to Kēshī to Mizu no Soko!" (Japanese: ミルとケーシィと水の底！)	September 27, 2007	January 26, 2008
516	—	48	"Ash and Dawn! Head for a New Adventure!!"; Transliteration: "Satoshi to Hikari! Aratanaru Bōken ni Mukatte!!" (Japanese: サトシとヒカリ！新たなる冒険に向かって！！)	September 27, 2007	—
517	512	49	"Dawn's Early Night!" (Pokémon Contest! Yosuga Tournament!!); Transliteration: "Pokemon Kontesto! Yosuga Taikai!!" (Japanese: ポケモンコンテスト！ヨスガ大会！！)	October 4, 2007	January 26, 2008
518	513	50	"Tag! We're It...!" (Everyone Participate! Tag Battle!!); Transliteration: "Zen'in Sanka! Taggu Batoru!!" (Japanese: 全員参加！タッグバトル！！)	October 4, 2007	February 1, 2008
519	514	51	"Glory Blaze!" (Hikozaru vs. Zangoose! Destined Battle!!); Transliteration: "Hikozaru Tai Zangūsu! Unmei no Batoru!!" (Japanese: ヒコザルVSザングース！運命のバトル！！)	October 18, 2007	February 1, 2008
520	515	52	"Smells Like Team Spirit!" (Tag Battle! Final!!); Transliteration: "Taggu Batoru! Fainaru!!" (Japanese: タッグバトル！ファイナル！！)	October 25, 2007	February 1, 2008

=== Season 11: Diamond and Pearl: Battle Dimension (2007–08) ===
Jap. overall	Eng. overall	No. in season	English title Japanese title	Original release date	English air date
521	516	1	"Tears for Fears!" (Hikozaru's Tears!); Transliteration: "Hikozaru no Namida!" (Japanese: ヒコザルの涙！)	November 8, 2007	April 12, 2008
522	517	2	"Once There Were Greenfields" (Natane and Sabonea! Farewell to Whom!); Transliteration: "Natane to Sabonea! Sayonara wa Dare no Tame!" (Japanese: ナタネとサボネア！さよならは誰のため！)	November 15, 2007	April 19, 2008
523	518	3	"Throwing the Track Switch" (Aipom and Buizel! Respective Roads!!); Transliteration: "Eipamu to Buizeru! Sorezore no Michi!!" (Japanese: エイパムとブイゼル！それぞれの道！！)	November 22, 2007	April 26, 2008
524	519	4	"The Keystone Pops!" (Mikaruge's Keystone!); Transliteration: "Mikaruge no Kanameishi!" (Japanese: ミカルゲの要石！)	November 29, 2007	May 10, 2008
525	520	5	"Bibarel Gnaws Best!" (Bidaru Knew!); Transliteration: "Bīdaru wa Shitteita!" (Japanese: ビーダルは知っていた！)	November 29, 2007	May 17, 2008
526	521	6	"Nosing 'Round the Mountain!" (Dainose! Burning Spirit!!); Transliteration: "Dainōzu! Atsuki Tamashii!!" (Japanese: ダイノーズ！熱き魂！！)	December 6, 2007	May 24, 2008
527	522	7	"Luxray Vision!" (Rentorar's Eye!); Transliteration: "Rentorā no Hitomi!" (Japanese: レントラーの瞳！)	December 13, 2007	May 31, 2008
528	523	8	"Journey to the Unown!" (The Unknown of Zui Ruins!); Transliteration: "Zui no Iseki no Annōn!" (Japanese: ズイの遺跡のアンノーン！)	December 20, 2007	June 7, 2008
529	524	9	"Team Shocker!" (Pokémon Contest! Zui Tournament!!); Transliteration: "Pokémon Kontesto! Zui Taikai!!" (Japanese: ポケモンコンテスト！ズイ大会！！)	December 20, 2007	June 14, 2008
530	525	10	"Tanks for the Memories!" (Miltank of the Maid Café!); Transliteration: "Meido Kafe no Mirutanku!" (Japanese: メイドカフェのミルタンク！)	January 10, 2008	June 21, 2008
531	526	11	"Hot Springing a Leak!" (The Urimoo Trio and the Steaming Hot Water Battle!!); Transliteration: "Urimū Torio to Yukemuri Batoru!!" (Japanese: ウリムートリオと湯けむりバトル！！)	January 17, 2008	June 28, 2008
532	527	12	"Riding the Winds of Change!" (Glion and Gligar! Escaping the Maze of Wind!); Transliteration: "Guraion to Guraigā! Kaze no Meiro o Nukete!!" (Japanese: グライオンとグライガー！風の迷路をぬけて！！)	January 24, 2008	July 5, 2008
533	528	13	"Sleight of Sand!" (Pachirisu is in Kabarudon's Mouth!?); Transliteration: "Pachirisu wa Kabarudon no Kuchi no Naka!?" (Japanese: パチリスはカバルドンの口の中！？)	January 31, 2008	July 12, 2008
534	529	14	"Lost Leader Strategy!" (Lucario! Wave Bomb of Anger!!); Transliteration: "Rukario! Ikari no Hadōdan!!" (Japanese: ルカリオ！怒りのはどうだん！！)	February 7, 2008	July 19, 2008
535	530	15	"Crossing the Battle Line!" (Hikari's First Gym Battle!!); Transliteration: "Hikari Hajimete no Jimu Batoru!!" (Japanese: ヒカリはじめてのジムバトル！！)	February 14, 2008	July 26, 2008
536	531	16	"A Triple Fighting Chance!" (Tobari Gym! Lucario Against Buoysel!!); Transliteration: "Tobari Jimu! Rukario Tai Buizeru!!" (Japanese: トバリジム！ルカリオ対ブイゼル！！)	February 28, 2008	August 2, 2008
537	532	17	"Enter Galactic!" (Lovely Fashion! Their Name is Team Galaxy!!); Transliteration: "Suteki Fasshon! Sono na wa Ginga-dan!!" (Japanese: ステキファッション！その名はギンガ団！！)	March 6, 2008	August 9, 2008
538	533	18	"The Bells Are Singing!" (Pull Yourself Together, Lisyan!); Transliteration: "Shanto Shite Rīshan!" (Japanese: シャンとしてリーシャン！)	March 13, 2008	August 16, 2008
539	534	19	"Pokémon Ranger and the Kidnapped Riolu! Part 1" (Pokémon Ranger! Wave-Guiding Riolu!! [Part 1]); Transliteration: "Pokémon Renjā! Hadō no Rioru!! (Zenpen)" (Japanese: ポケモンレンジャー！波導のリオル！！（前編）)	March 20, 2008	November 1, 2008
540	535	20	"Pokémon Ranger and the Kidnapped Riolu! Part 2" (Pokémon Ranger! Wave-Guiding Riolu!! [Part 2]); Transliteration: "Pokémon Renjā! Hadō no Rioru!! (Kōhen)" (Japanese: ポケモンレンジャー！波導のリオル！！（後編）)	March 20, 2008	November 8, 2008
541	536	21	"Crossing Paths" (Goodbye Dokukeiru!); Transliteration: "Sayonara Dokukeiru!" (Japanese: さよならドクケイル！)	April 3, 2008	August 23, 2008
542	537	22	"Pika and Goliath!" (Pikachu! Raichu! The Road to Evolution!!); Transliteration: "Pikachū! Raichū! Shinka e no Michi!!" (Japanese: ピカチュウ！ライチュウ！進化への道！！)	April 3, 2008	August 30, 2008
543	538	23	"Our Cup Runneth Over!" (The Contest Master Mikuri Appears!!); Transliteration: "Kontesuto Masutā, Mikuri Tōjō!!" (Japanese: コンテストマスター・ミクリ登場！！)	April 17, 2008	September 6, 2008
544	539	24	"A Full Course Tag Battle!" (Seven Stars Restaurant! Tag Battle for a Full Course!!); Transliteration: "Resutoran Nanatsuboshi! Taggu Batoru de Furukōsu!!" (Japanese: レストラン七つ星！タッグバトルでフルコース！！)	April 24, 2008	September 13, 2008
545	540	25	"Staging a Heroes' Welcome!" (Everyone's a Rival! Mikuri Cup!!); Transliteration: "Minna Raibaru! Mikuri Kappu!!" (Japanese: みんなライバル！ミクリカップ！！)	May 8, 2008	September 20, 2008
546	541	26	"Pruning a Passel of Pals!" (Fierce Fighting! Respective Battles!!); Transliteration: "Gekitō! Sorezore no Batoru!!" (Japanese: 激闘！それぞれのバトル！！)	May 8, 2008	September 27, 2008
547	542	27	"Strategy with a Smile!" (Decisive Match! Hikari vs. Haruka!!); Transliteration: "Kessen! Hikari Tai Haruka!!" (Japanese: 決戦！ヒカリVSハルカ！！)	May 15, 2008	October 11, 2008
548	543	28	"The Thief That Keeps on Thieving!" (Yanyanma! The Capture Operation!); Transliteration: "Yanyanma! Getto Sakusen!!" (Japanese: ヤンヤンマ！ゲット作戦！！)	May 22, 2008	October 18, 2008
549	544	29	"Chim-Charred!" (The Scorching Hikozaru!); Transliteration: "Shakunetsu no Hikozaru!" (Japanese: 灼熱のヒコザル！)	May 29, 2008	October 25, 2008
550	545	30	"Cream of the Croagunk Crop!" (The Gregguru Festival of the Nomose Great Marsh!?); Transliteration: "Nomose Shitsugen no Guregguru Matsuri!?" (Japanese: ノモセ大湿原のグレッグル祭り！？)	June 5, 2008	November 15, 2008
551	546	31	"A Crasher Course in Power!" (Nomose Gym! Vs. Maximum Mask!!); Transliteration: "Nomose Jimu! Tai Makishimamu Kamen!!" (Japanese: ノモセジム！VSマキシマム仮面！！)	June 19, 2008	November 22, 2008
552	547	32	"Hungry for the Good Life!" (The Gluttonous Urimoo at Mr. Urayama's!!); Transliteration: "Urayama-sanchi no Ōgui Urimū!" (Japanese: ウラヤマさんちの大食いウリムー！)	July 3, 2008	December 6, 2008
553	548	33	"Fighting Fear with Fear!" (Gligar! Wings of Friendship!!); Transliteration: "Guraigā! Yūjō no Tsubasa!!" (Japanese: グライガー！友情の翼！！)	July 3, 2008	December 13, 2008
554	549	34	"Arriving in Style!" (Yosuga Collection! The Road to Becoming a Pokémon Stylist!!); Transliteration: "Yosuga Korekushon! Pokémon Sutairisuto e no Michi!!" (Japanese: ヨスガコレクション！ポケモンスタイリストへの道！！)	July 10, 2008	December 20, 2008
555	550	35	"The Psyduck Stops Here!" (The Koduck Roadblock!); Transliteration: "Kodakku no Tōsenbo!" (Japanese: コダックの通せんぼ！)	July 24, 2008	December 27, 2008
556	551	36	"Camping it Up!" (The Pokémon Summer School Course!!); Transliteration: "Pokémon Samāsukūru Kaikō!!" (Japanese: ポケモンサマースクール開講！！)	August 7, 2008	January 3, 2009
557	552	37	"Up Close and Personable!" (Research Presentation: "Legend of the Lake"!); Transliteration: "Kenkyū Happyō, Mizuumi no Densetsu!'" (Japanese: 研究発表「湖の伝説」！)	August 14, 2008	January 10, 2009
558	553	38	"Ghoul Daze!" (It's Ghost Time After School!); Transliteration: "Hōkago ha Gōsuto Taimu!?" (Japanese: 放課後はゴーストタイム！？)	August 21, 2008	January 17, 2009
559	554	39	"One Team, Two Team, Red Team, Blue Team!" (The Final Showdown! Pokémon Triathlon!); Transliteration: "Saigo no Daishōbu! Pokémon Toraiasuron!" (Japanese: 最後の大勝負！ポケモントライアスロン！)	August 28, 2008	January 24, 2009
560	555	40	"A Lean Mean Team Rocket Machine!" (Back to Basics, Team Rocket!?); Transliteration: "Genten Kaiki da Roketto-Dan!?" (Japanese: 原点回帰だロケット団！？)	September 4, 2008	January 31, 2009
561	556	41	"Playing the Leveling Field!" (The Dancing Gym Leader! Melissa Appears!!); Transliteration: "Odoru Jimu Rīdā! Merissa Tōjō!!" (Japanese: 踊るジムリーダー！メリッサ登場！！)	September 11, 2008	February 7, 2009
562	557	42	"Doc Brock!" (Pachirisu Has a Fever! Being Two People Taking Care!?); Transliteration: "Pachirisu o Netsu desu! Futari de Orusuban!?" (Japanese: パチリスお熱です！2人でお留守番！？)	September 25, 2008	February 14, 2009
563	558	43	"Battling the Generation Gap!" (Pokémon Contest! Kannagi Tournament!!); Transliteration: "Pokémon Kontesuto! Kannagi Taikai!!" (Japanese: ポケモンコンテスト！カンナギ大会！！)	September 25, 2008	February 21, 2009
564	559	44	"Losing Its Lustrous!" (Team Galaxy Attacks!! [Part 1]); Transliteration: "Ginga-Dan Shūgeki!! (Zenpen)" (Japanese: ギンガ団襲撃！！（前編）)	October 2, 2008	February 28, 2009
565	560	45	"Double Team Turnover!" (Team Galaxy Attacks!! [Part 2]); Transliteration: "Ginga-Dan Shūgeki!! (Kōhen)" (Japanese: ギンガ団襲撃！！（後編）)	October 2, 2008	March 7, 2009
566	561	46	"If the Scarf Fits, Wear It!" (The Floating Unidentified Mysterious Monster!?); Transliteration: "Ukabu Mikakunin Kaibutsu!?" (Japanese: 浮かぶ未確認怪物！？)	October 16, 2008	March 21, 2009
567	562	47	"A Trainer and Child Reunion!" (Elite Four Ryou! Forest of Meeting and Separation!); Transliteration: "Shitennō Ryō! Deai to Wakare no Mori!" (Japanese: 四天王リョウ！出会いと別れの森！)	October 23, 2008	March 28, 2009
568	563	48	"Aiding the Enemy!" (Naetoru, Hayashigame... and Dodaitosu!); Transliteration: "Naetoru, Hayashigame... Soshite Dodaitosu!" (Japanese: ナエトル、ハヤシガメ…そしてドダイトス！)	October 30, 2008	April 4, 2009
569	564	49	"Barry's Busting Out All Over!" (Rival Trainer Jun Appears!!); Transliteration: "Raibaru Torēnā, Jun Tōjō!!" (Japanese: ライバルトレーナー・ジュン登場！！)	November 6, 2008	April 11, 2009
570	565	50	"Shield with a Twist!" (Yosuga Gym Match! Vs. Melissa!!); Transliteration: "Yosuga Jimu Sen! Tai Merissa!!" (Japanese: ヨスガジム戦！VSメリッサ！！)	November 13, 2008	April 18, 2009
571	566	51	"Jumping Rocket Ship!" (Chaotic Melee in Mio City!); Transliteration: "Kōsen Konran Mio Shiti!" (Japanese: 混戦混乱ミオシティ！)	November 20, 2008	April 25, 2009
572	567	52	"Sleepless in Pre-Battle!" (Cresselia vs. Darkrai!); Transliteration: "Kureseria Tai Darkurai!" (Japanese: クレセリアVSダークライ！)	December 4, 2008	May 2, 2009

=== Season 12: Diamond and Pearl: Galactic Battles (2008–09) ===
Jap. overall	Eng. overall	No. in season	English title Japanese title	Original release date	English air date
573	568	1	"Get Your Rotom Running!" (Yōkan and Rotom!); Transliteration: "Yōkan to Rotomu!" (Japanese: 羊羹とロトム！)	December 4, 2008	May 9, 2009
574	569	2	"A Breed Stampede!" (The Way to Befriend Pokémon!?); Transliteration: "Pokémon to Nakayokunaru Hōhō!?" (Japanese: ポケモンと仲良くなる方法！？)	December 11, 2008	May 16, 2009
575	570	3	"Ancient Family Matters!" (Rampardos vs. Torideps!!); Transliteration: "Ramuparudosu Tai Toridepusu!!" (Japanese: ラムパルドVSトリデプス！！)	December 18, 2008	May 23, 2009
576	571	4	"Dealing with Defensive Types!" (Mio Gym Battle! Steel Battle!); Transliteration: "Mio Jimu Sen! Hagane no Batoru!!" (Japanese: ミオジム戦！はがねのバトル！！)	December 25, 2008	May 30, 2009
577	572	5	"Leading a Stray!" (The Stray Hoeruko!); Transliteration: "Maigo no Hoeruko!" (Japanese: 迷子のホエルコ！)	January 8, 2009	June 6, 2009
578	573	6	"Steeling Peace of Mind!" (Gen and Lucario!); Transliteration: "Gen to Rukario!" (Japanese: ゲンとルカリオ！)	January 15, 2009	June 13, 2009
579	574	7	"Saving the World from Ruins!" (Ruins of Steel Island!); Transliteration: "Kōtetsu Shima no Iseki!" (Japanese: 鋼鉄島の遺跡！)	January 22, 2009	June 20, 2009
580	575	8	"Cheers on Castaways Isle!" (The Pikachu-Pochama Drifting Chronicle!); Transliteration: "Pikachū, Pocchama Hyōryūki!" (Japanese: ピカチュウ・ポッチャマ漂流記！)	January 29, 2009	June 27, 2009
581	576	9	"Hold the Phione!" (Mischievous Phione!); Transliteration: "Itazura Fione!" (Japanese: いたずらフィオネ！)	February 5, 2009	July 4, 2009
582	577	10	"Another One Gabites the Dust!" (Pokémon Contest! Akebi Tournament!!); Transliteration: "Pokémon Kontesuto! Akebi Taikai!!" (Japanese: ポケモンコンテスト！アケビ大会！！)	February 12, 2009	July 11, 2009
583	578	11	"Stealing the Conversation!" (Wild Junsar and Partner Perap!); Transliteration: "Wairudo Junsā to Aibō Perappu!" (Japanese: ワイルドジュンサーと相棒ペラップ！)	February 19, 2009	July 18, 2009
584	579	12	"The Drifting Snorunt!" (Yukimenoko in a Snowstorm!); Transliteration: "Fubuki no Naka no Yukimenoko!" (Japanese: 吹雪の中のユキメノコ！)	February 26, 2009	July 25, 2009
585	580	13	"Noodles! Roamin' Off!" (Rocket-dan Breakup!?); Transliteration: "Roketto-dan Kaisan!?" (Japanese: ロケット団解散！？)	March 5, 2009	August 1, 2009
586	581	14	"Pursuing a Lofty Goal!" (PokéRinger! Big Decisive Battle of Sky!!); Transliteration: "Pokéringa! Tenkū Daikessen!!" (Japanese: ポケリンガ！天空大決戦！！)	March 12, 2009	August 8, 2009
587	582	15	"Trials and Adulations!" (Clash! Mammoo vs. Bossgodora!!); Transliteration: "Gekitotsu! Manmū Tai Bosugodora!!" (Japanese: 激突！マンムーVSボスゴドラ！！)	March 26, 2009	August 15, 2009
588	—	16	Mysterious Creatures, Pokémon! Transliteration: "Fushigi na Ikimono Poketto Monsutā!" (Japanese: ふしぎないきものポケットモンスター！)	March 26, 2009	N/A
589	583	17	"The Lonely Snover!" (The Lonely Yukikaburi!); Transliteration: "Sabishigariya no Yukikaburi!" (Japanese: さびしがりやのユキカブリ！)	April 2, 2009	August 22, 2009
590	584	18	"Stopped in the Name of Love!" (Evolution! This Time for Pochama!?); Transliteration: "Shinka! Sono Toki Pocchama wa!?" (Japanese: 進化！その時ポッチャマは！？)	April 2, 2009	August 29, 2009
591	585	19	"Old Rivals, New Tricks!" (Pokémon Contest! Tatsunami Tournament!!); Transliteration: "Pokémon Kontesuto! Tatsunami Taikai!!" (Japanese: ポケモンコンテスト！タツナミ大会！！)	April 16, 2009	September 5, 2009
592	586	20	"To Thine Own Pokémon Be True!" (Pokémon Ping-Pong Competition! Do Your Best, Eteboth!!); Transliteration: "Pokémon Pinpon Taikai! Etebōsu Ganbaru!!" (Japanese: ポケモンピンポン大会！エテボースがんばる！！)	April 23, 2009	September 12, 2009
593	587	21	"Battling a Cute Drama!" (Cherinbo! Brave Battle!?); Transliteration: "Cherinbo! Kenage na Batoru!?" (Japanese: チェリンボ！けなげなバトル！？)	April 30, 2009	September 26, 2009
594	588	22	"Classroom Training!" (Miss Suzuna of the Trainers' School!); Transliteration: "Torēnāzu Sukūru no Suzuna-sensei!" (Japanese: トレーナーズスクールのスズナ先生！)	May 7, 2009	October 3, 2009
595	589	23	"Sliding Into Seventh!" (Kissaki Gym! Ice Battle!!); Transliteration: "Kissaki Jimu! Kōri no Batoru!!" (Japanese: キッサキジム！氷のバトル！！)	May 14, 2009	October 10, 2009
596	590	24	"A Pyramiding Rage!" (Battle Pyramid! Shinji vs. Jindai!!); Transliteration: "Batoru Piramiddo! Shinji Tai Jindai!!" (Japanese: バトルピラミッド！シンジVSジンダイ！！)	May 21, 2009	October 17, 2009
597	591	25	"Pillars of Friendship!" (Resurrected Regigigas! J Returns!!); Transliteration: "Fukkatsu no Rejigigasu! Jē Futatabi!!" (Japanese: 復活のレジギガス！J再び！！)	May 28, 2009	October 24, 2009
598	592	26	"Frozen on Their Tracks!" (Denryuu Train! Handsome Appears!!); Transliteration: "Denryū Ressha! Hansamu Tōjō!!" (Japanese: デンリュウ列車！ハンサム登場！！)	June 4, 2009	October 31, 2009
599	593	27	"Pedal to the Mettle!" (Full Battle! Shinji vs. Satoshi!! [Part 1]); Transliteration: "Furu Batoru! Shinji Tai Satoshi!! (Zenpen)" (Japanese: フルバトル！シンジVSサトシ！！（前編）)	June 11, 2009	November 7, 2009
600	594	28	"Evolving Strategies!" (Full Battle! Shinji vs. Satoshi!! [Part 2]); Transliteration: "Furu Batoru! Shinji Tai Satoshi!! -Kōhen-" (Japanese: フルバトル！シンジVSサトシ！！（後編）)	June 18, 2009	November 14, 2009
601	595	29	"Uncrushing Defeat!" (The Shadow of Uxie!); Transliteration: "Yukushī no Kage!" (Japanese: ユクシーの影！)	June 25, 2009	November 21, 2009
602	596	30	"Promoting Healthy Tangrowth!" (King of the Forest! Mojumbo!!); Transliteration: "Mori no Ōja! Mojanbo!!" (Japanese: 森の王者！モジャンボ！！)	July 2, 2009	December 5, 2009
603	597	31	"Beating the Bustle and Hustle!" (Everybody Participate! Pokémon Hustle!); Transliteration: "Zen'in Sansen! Pokémon Hassuru!" (Japanese: 全員参戦！ポケモンハッスル！)	July 9, 2009	December 12, 2009
604	598	32	"Gateway to Ruin!" (Mt. Tengan Ruins! Conspiracy of Ginga-dan!!); Transliteration: "Tenganzan no Iseki! Ginga-dan no Inbō!!" (Japanese: テンガン山の遺跡！ギンガ団の陰謀！！)	July 23, 2009	December 19, 2009
605	599	33	"Three Sides to Every Story!" (Marill, Pochama & Elekid!!); Transliteration: "Mariru, Pocchama, Erekiddo!!" (Japanese: マリル・ポッチャマ・エレキッド！！)	August 6, 2009	December 26, 2009
606	600	34	"Strategy Begins at Home!" (Hikari vs. Mama! Parent-Child Showdown!!); Transliteration: "Hikari Tai Mama! Oyako Taiketsu!!" (Japanese: ヒカリVSママ！親子対決！！)	August 13, 2009	January 2, 2010
607	601	35	"A Faux Oak Finish!" (Rescue Dr. Ohkido! Nyorotono vs. Gureggru!!); Transliteration: "Ōkido-hakase o Kyūshutsu se yo! Nyorotono Tai Guregguru!!" (Japanese: オーキド博士を救出せよ！ニョロトノVSグレッグル！！)	August 20, 2009	January 9, 2010
608	602	36	"Historical Mystery Tour!" (Naty, Natio...Mysterious Forest!); Transliteration: "Neiti, Neitio... Fushigi na Mori!" (Japanese: ネイティ、ネイティオ…不思議な森！)	August 27, 2009	January 16, 2010
609	603	37	"Challenging a Towering Figure" (Tower Tycoon! That Man, Kurotsugu!!); Transliteration: "Tawā Taikūn! Sono Otoko, Kurotsugu!!" (Japanese: タワータイクーン！その男、クロツグ！！)	September 3, 2009	January 23, 2010
610	604	38	"Where No Togepi Has Gone Before!" (The Worst Togepi in History!); Transliteration: "Shijō Saiaku no Togepī!" (Japanese: 史上最悪のトゲピー！)	September 10, 2009	January 30, 2010
611	605	39	"An Egg Scramble!" (Johto Festival! Chikorita and Waninoko Appear!!); Transliteration: "Jōhto Fesuta! Chikorīta to Waninoko Tōjō!!" (Japanese: ジョウトフェスタ！チコリータとワニノコ登場！！)	September 17, 2009	February 6, 2010
612	606	40	"Gone With the Windworks!" (Dungeon Capture!? The Valley Powerplant!); Transliteration: "Danjon Kōryaku!? Tanima no Hatsudensho!" (Japanese: ダンジョン攻略！？谷間の発電所！)	September 17, 2009	February 13, 2010
613	607	41	"A Rivalry to Gible On!" (Fukamaru... I'll get you!); Transliteration: "Fukamaru... Getto da ze!" (Japanese: フカマル…ゲットだぜ！)	October 1, 2009	February 20, 2010
614	608	42	"Dressed for Jess Success!" (Pokémon Contest! Suiren Tournament!!); Transliteration: "Pokémon Kontesuto! Suiren Taikai!!" (Japanese: ポケモンコンテスト！スイレン大会！！)	October 1, 2009	February 27, 2010
615	609	43	"Bagged Then Tagged!" (Satoshi to Hikari! Tag Battle!!); Transliteration: "Satoshi to Hikari! Taggu Batoru!!" (Japanese: サトシとヒカリ！タッグバトル！！)	October 15, 2009	March 6, 2010
616	610	44	"Try for the Family Stone!" (Muma, Yamikarasu and the Dark Stone!); Transliteration: "Mūma to Yamikarasu to Yami no Ishi!" (Japanese: ムウマとヤミカラスとやみのいし！)	October 22, 2009	March 13, 2010
617	611	45	"Sticking with Who You Know!" (Pikachu and Pochama, Keep Apart!!); Transliteration: "Pikachū Pocchama Kuttsukanai de!!" (Japanese: ピカチュウポッチャマくっつかないで！！)	October 29, 2009	March 20, 2010
618	612	46	"Unlocking the Red Chain of Events!" (The Red Chain! Activated by the Ginga-dan!!); Transliteration: "Akai Kusari! Ginga-dan Shidō!!" (Japanese: 赤い鎖！ギンガ団始動！！)	November 5, 2009	March 27, 2010
619	613	47	"The Needs of the Three!" (Agnome, Uxie & Emrit!); Transliteration: "Agunomu, Yukushī, Emuritto!" (Japanese: アグノム・ユクシー・エムリット！)	November 12, 2009	April 3, 2010
620	614	48	"The Battle Finale of Legend!" (Dialga and Palkia! The Final Battle!!); Transliteration: "Diaruga to Parukia! Saigo no Tatakai!!" (Japanese: ディアルガとパルキア！最後の戦い！！)	November 12, 2009	April 10, 2010
621	615	49	"The Treasure Is All Mine!" (Full of Danger! Kojirō's Treasure Chest!!); Transliteration: "Kiken ga Ippai! Kojirō no Takarabako!!" (Japanese: 危険がいっぱい！コジロウの宝箱！！)	November 26, 2009	April 17, 2010
622	616	50	"Mastering Current Events!" (The Air Battle Master Appears! Glion vs. Hassam!!); Transliteration: "Ea Batoru Masutā Tōjō! Guraion Tai Hassamu!!" (Japanese: エアバトルマスター登場！グライオンVSハッサム！！)	December 3, 2009	April 24, 2010
623	617	51	"Double-Time Battle Training!" (Double Battle! Mammoo and Hinoarashi!!); Transliteration: "Daburu Batoru! Manmū to Hinoarashi!!" (Japanese: ダブルバトル！マンムーとヒノアラシ！！)	December 10, 2009	May 1, 2010
624	618	52	"A Meteoric Rise to Excellence!" (Fukamaru and Draco Meteor!!); Transliteration: "Fukamaru to Ryūseigun!!" (Japanese: フカマルとりゅうせいぐん！！)	December 17, 2009	May 8, 2010
625	619	53	"Gotta Get a Gible!" (Fukamaru! I'll get you!!); Transliteration: "Fukamaru! Getto da ze!!" (Japanese: フカマル！ゲットだぜ！！)	December 24, 2009	May 15, 2010

=== Season 13: Diamond and Pearl: Sinnoh League Victors (2010) ===
Jap. overall	Eng. overall	No. in season	English title Japanese title	Original release date	English air date
626	620	1	"Regaining the Home Advantage!" (Loud Roar! Jibacoil vs. Metagross!!); Transliteration: "Bakusō! Jibakoiru Tai Metagurosu!!" (Japanese: 爆走！ジバコイルVSメタグロス！！)	January 7, 2010	June 5, 2010 (Note: This episode was originally set to be broadcast on May 22, 2010, but was pushed back for unknown reasons.)
627	621	2	"Short and to the Punch!" (Roaring Freezing Punch! Buoysel vs. Barrierd!!); Transliteration: "Unare Reitō Panchi! Buizeru Tai Bariyādo!!" (Japanese: 唸れれいとうパンチ！ブイゼルVSバリヤード！！)	January 14, 2010	June 12, 2010
628	622	3	"A Marathon Rivalry!" (Get Fired Up, Kabigon! The Pokéthlon King!!); Transliteration: "Moe yo Kabigon! Pokesuron no Ōja!!" (Japanese: 燃えよカビゴン！ポケスロンの王者！！)	January 21, 2010	June 19, 2010
629	623	4	"Yes in Dee Dee, It's Dawn!" (Begin! Pokémon Contest – Asatsuki Tournament!!); Transliteration: "Kaimaku! Pokemon Kontesuto, Asatsuki Taikai!!" (Japanese: 開幕！ポケモンコンテスト・アサツキ大会！！)	January 28, 2010	June 26, 2010
630	624	5	"Playing the Performance Encore!" (Double Battle! Vs. Purasuru & Minun!!); Transliteration: "Daburu Batoru! Tai Purasuru, Mainan!!" (Japanese: ダブルバトル！VSプラスル・マイナン！！)	February 4, 2010	July 3, 2010
631	625	6	"Fighting Ire with Fire!" (Explosive Evolution! Goukazaru!!); Transliteration: "Baku Shinka! Gōkazaru!!" (Japanese: 爆進化！ゴウカザル!!)	February 11, 2010	July 10, 2010
632	626	7	"Piplup, Up and Away!" (Pochama Goes Astray!); Transliteration: "Potchama Hagureru!" (Japanese: ポッチャマはぐれる！)	February 18, 2010	July 17, 2010
633	627	8	"Flint Sparks the Fire!" (Elite Four Ōba and Gym Leader - Denji!); Transliteration: "Shitennō Ōba to Jimu Rīdā, Denji!" (Japanese: 四天王オーバとジムリーダー・デンジ！)	February 25, 2010	July 24, 2010
634	628	9	"The Fleeing Tower of Sunyshore!" (Liftoff! Nagisa Tower!!); Transliteration: "Hasshin! Nagisa Tawā!!" (Japanese: 発進！ナギサタワー！！)	March 4, 2010	July 31, 2010
635	629	10	"Teaching the Student Teacher!" (The Pokémon School at the Seaside!); Transliteration: "Umibe no Pokemon Sukūru!" (Japanese: 海辺のポケモンスクール！)	March 11, 2010	August 7, 2010
636	630	11	"Keeping in Top Forme!" (Fly Shaymin! Towards the Far Side of the Sky!!); Transliteration: "Tobe Sheimi! Sora no Kanata e!!" (Japanese: 飛べシェイミ！空の彼方へ！！)	March 18, 2010	August 14, 2010
637	631	12	"Pokémon Ranger: Heatran Rescue!" (Pokémon Ranger! Heatran Rescue Mission!!); Transliteration: "Pokemon Renjā! Hīdoran Kyūshutsu Sakusen!!" (Japanese: ポケモンレンジャー！ヒードラン救出作戦！！)	March 18, 2010	October 16, 2010
638	632	13	"An Elite Coverup!" (Elite Four Kikuno! Kabarudon vs. Dodaitose!!); Transliteration: "Shitennō Kikuno! Kabarudon Tai Dodaitosu!!" (Japanese: 四天王キクノ！カバルドンVSドダイトス！！)	April 1, 2010	August 21, 2010
639	633	14	"Dawn of a Royal Day!" (Togekiss Dance! The Princess's Pokémon Contest!!); Transliteration: "Togekissu Mau! Ōjosama no Pokemon Kontesuto!!" (Japanese: トゲキッス舞う！王女さまのポケモンコンテスト！！)	April 1, 2010	August 28, 2010
640	634	15	"With the Easiest of Grace!" (Togekiss! The Magnificent Battle!!); Transliteration: "Togekissu! Kareinaru Batoru!!" (Japanese: トゲキッス！華麗なるバトル！！)	April 15, 2010	September 4, 2010
641	635	16	"Dealing with a Fierce Double Ditto Drama!" (Metamon – Transformation Battle! Which One is the Real One!?); Transliteration: "Metamon Henshin Batoru! Honmono wa Dotchi~nyo!?" (Japanese: メタモン・へんしんバトル！本物はドッチ～ニョ！？)	April 22, 2010	September 11, 2010
642	636	17	"Last Call-First Round!" (Grand Festival! The Art of Flame and Ice!!); Transliteration: "Gurando Fesutibaru Kaimaku! Honō to Kōri no Āto!!" (Japanese: グランドフェスティバル開幕！炎と氷のアート！！)	April 29, 2010	September 18, 2010
643	637	18	"Opposites Interact!" (Mammoo, Pachirisu! The Ice Chandelier is Chosen!!); Transliteration: "Manmū, Pachirisu! Kimero Kōri no Shanderia!!" (Japanese: マンムー、パチリス！決めろ氷のシャンデリア！！)	May 6, 2010	September 25, 2010
644	638	19	"Coming Full-Festival Circle!" (The Semi-Finals! Who is Heading to the Finals!?); Transliteration: "Semifainaru! Kesshō e Susumu no wa!?" (Japanese: セミファイナル！決勝へ進むのは！？)	May 13, 2010	October 2, 2010
645	639	20	"A Grand Fight for Winning!" (Conclusive Rival Showdown! Hikari vs. Nozomi!!); Transliteration: "Ketchaku Raibaru Taiketsu! Hikari Tai Nozomi!!" (Japanese: 決着ライバル対決！ヒカリVSノゾミ！！)	May 20, 2010	October 9, 2010
646	640	21	"For the Love of Meowth!" (Goodbye Team Rocket! Love of Nyarth!?); Transliteration: "Sayonara Roketto-dan! Nyāsu no Koi!?" (Japanese: さよならロケット団！ニャースの恋！？)	May 27, 2010	October 23, 2010
647	641	22	"The Eighth Wonder of the Sinnoh World!" (Electric Shock Battle! The Final Badge!!); Transliteration: "Dengeki Batoru! Saigo no Bajji!!" (Japanese: 電撃バトル！最後のバッジ！！)	June 3, 2010	October 30, 2010
648	642	23	"Four Roads Diverged in a Pokémon Port!" (Satoshi vs. Kengo! Respective Departure!!); Transliteration: "Satoshi Tai Kengo! Sorezore no Funade!!" (Japanese: サトシVSケンゴ！それぞれの船出！！)	June 10, 2010	November 6, 2010
649	643	24	"Bucking the Treasure Trend!" (Treasure Hunter – Baku and Yajilon!); Transliteration: "Torejā Hantā – Baku to Yajiron!" (Japanese: トレジャーハンター・バクとヤジロン！)	June 17, 2010	November 13, 2010
650	644	25	"An Old Family Blend!" (Eve of Fierce Battle! The Great Gathering of Satoshi's Pokémon!!); Transliteration: "Nessen Zen'ya! Satoshi no Pokemon Daishūgō!!" (Japanese: 熱戦前夜！サトシのポケモン大集合！！)	June 24, 2010	November 20, 2010
651	645	26	"League Unleashed!" (Begin! Sinnoh League – Suzuran Tournament!!); Transliteration: "Kaimaku! Shin'ō Rīgu – Suzuran Taikai!!" (Japanese: 開幕！シンオウリーグ・スズラン大会！！)	July 1, 2010	November 27, 2010
652	646	27	"Casting a Paul on Barry!" (The Third-Round Battle of Sinnoh League! Shinji Against Jun!!); Transliteration: "Shin'ō Rīgu San Kaisen! Shinji Tai Jun!!" (Japanese: シンオウリーグ三回戦！シンジ対ジュン！！)	July 15, 2010	December 4, 2010
653	647	28	"Working on a Right Move!" (Trick Room of Terror! Satoshi Against Kouhei!!); Transliteration: "Kyōfu no Torikku Rūmu! Satoshi Tai Kōhei!!" (Japanese: 恐怖のトリックルーム！サトシ対コウヘイ！！)	July 22, 2010	December 11, 2010
654	648	29	"Familiarity Breeds Strategy!" (Rival Decisive Battle! Satoshi Against Shinji!!); Transliteration: "Raibaru Kessen! Satoshi Tai Shinji!!" (Japanese: ライバル決戦！サトシ対シンジ！！)	August 5, 2010	December 18, 2010
655	649	30	"A Real Rival Rouser!" (Intense Fighting Full Battle! Satoshi Against Shinji!!); Transliteration: "Gekitō Furu Batoru! Satoshi Tai Shinji!!" (Japanese: 激闘フルバトル！サトシ対シンジ！！)	August 12, 2010	January 8, 2011
656	650	31	"Battling a Thaw in Relations!" (Conclusive Rival Battle! Satoshi Against Shinji!!); Transliteration: "Ketchaku Raibaru Batoru! Satoshi Tai Shinji!!" (Japanese: 決着ライバルバトル！サトシ対シンジ！！)	August 19, 2010	January 15, 2011
657	651	32	"The Semi-Final Frontier!" (Sinnoh League Semi-Final! Darkrai Appears!!); Transliteration: "Shin'ō Rīgu Junkesshō! Dākurai Tōjō!!" (Japanese: シンオウリーグ準決勝！ダークライ登場！！)	August 26, 2010	January 22, 2011
658	652	33	"The Brockster Is In!" (Pokémon Doctor – Takeshi!); Transliteration: "Pokemon Dokutā – Takeshi!" (Japanese: ポケモンドクター・タケシ！)	September 2, 2010	January 29, 2011
659	653	34	"Memories Are Made of Bliss!" (Memories Are Pearls! Friendship is a Diamond!!); Transliteration: "Omoide wa Pāru! Yūjō wa Daiyamondo!!" (Japanese: 思い出はパール！友情はダイヤモンド！！)	September 9, 2010	February 5, 2011

Jap. overall	No. in season	Japanese title	Original release date
SP–1	SP–1	"Hikari - Setting Off on a New Journey!"; Transliteration: "Hikari - Arata Naru Tabidachi!" (Japanese: ヒカリ・新たなる旅立ち！)	February 3, 2011
SP–2	SP–2	"Nibi Gym - The Greatest Crisis Ever!"; Transliteration: "Nibi Jimu - Shinjō Saidai no Kiki!" (Japanese: ニビジム・史上最大の危機！)	February 3, 2011

=== Season 14: Black & White (2010–11) ===
Jap. overall	Eng. overall	No. in season	English title Japanese title	Original release date	English air date
660	654	1	"In the Shadow of Zekrom!" (To the Isshu Region! Zekrom's Shadow!!); Transliteration: "Isshu Chihō e! Zekuromu no Kage!!" (Japanese: イッシュ地方へ！ゼクロムの影！！)	September 23, 2010	February 12, 2011
661	655	2	"Enter Iris and Axew!" (Iris and Kibago!); Transliteration: "Airisu to Kibago!" (Japanese: アイリスとキバゴ！)	September 23, 2010	February 12, 2011
662	656	3	"A Sandile Gusher of Change!" (Mijumaru! Meguroco! Critical Moment!!); Transliteration: "Mijumaru! Meguroko! Kikkiippatsu!!" (Japanese: ミジュマル！メグロコ！危機一髪！！)	September 30, 2010	February 19, 2011
663	657	4	"The Battle Club and Tepig's Choice!" (Battle Club! A Mysterious Pokémon Appears!!); Transliteration: "Batoru Kurabu! Nazo no Pokemon Arawareru!!" (Japanese: バトルクラブ！謎のポケモン現る！！)	October 7, 2010	February 26, 2011
664	658	5	"Triple Leaders, Team Threats!" (San'yō Gym! Vs. Baoppu, Hiyappu and Yanappu!!); Transliteration: "San'yō Jimu! Tai Baoppu, Hiyappu, Yanappu!!" (Japanese: サンヨウジム！VSバオップ、ヒヤップ、ヤナップ！！)	October 14, 2010	March 5, 2011
665	659	6	"Dreams by the Yard Full!" (Former Building Site of Dreams! Munna and Musharna!!); Transliteration: "Yume no Atochi! Munna to Mushāna!!" (Japanese: 夢の跡地！ムンナとムシャーナ！！)	October 21, 2010	March 12, 2011
666	660	7	"Snivy Plays Hard to Catch!" (Get the Tsutarja That Knows Attract!?); Transliteration: "Tsutāja Getto de Meromero!?" (Japanese: ツタージャ・ゲットでメロメロ！？)	October 28, 2010	March 19, 2011
667	661	8	"Saving Darmanitan from the Bell!" (Darumakka and Hihidaruma! Secret of the Clocktower!!); Transliteration: "Darumakka to Hihidaruma! Dokeitō no Himitsu!!" (Japanese: ダルマッカとヒヒダルマ！時計塔の秘密！！)	November 4, 2010	March 26, 2011
668	662	9	"The Bloom Is on Axew!" (Out of Control Pendror! Rescue Kibago!); Transliteration: "Pendorā Bōsō! Kibago o Sukue!" (Japanese: ペンドラー暴走！キバゴを救え！)	November 11, 2010	April 2, 2011
669	663	10	"A Rival Battle for Club Champ!!" (Rival Battle! Tough Enemy Pururiru!!); Transliteration: "Raibaru Batoru! Kyōteki Pururiru!!" (Japanese: ライバルバトル！強敵プルリル！！)	November 18, 2010	April 9, 2011
670	664	11	"A Home for Dwebble!" (Ishizumai! Take Back Your Home!!); Transliteration: "Ishizumai! Jibun no Ie o Torimodose!!" (Japanese: イシズマイ！自分の家をとりもどせ！！)	December 2, 2010	April 16, 2011
671	665	12	"Here Comes the Trubbish Squad!" (The Yabukuron Squad and a Secret Base!?); Transliteration: "Yabukuron Sentai to Himitsukichi!?" (Japanese: ヤブクロン戦隊と秘密基地！？)	December 9, 2010	April 23, 2011
672	666	13	"Minccino–Neat and Tidy!" (Chillarmy is Clean!?); Transliteration: "Chirāmyi wa Kireizuki!?" (Japanese: チラーミィはきれいずき！？)	December 16, 2010	April 30, 2011
673	667	14	"A Night in the Nacrene City Museum!" (Shippō City! Museum Adventure!!); Transliteration: "Shippō Shiti! Hakubutsukan de Daibōken!!" (Japanese: シッポウシティ！博物館で大冒険！！)	December 23, 2010	May 7, 2011
674	668	15	"The Battle According to Lenora!" (Shippō Gym Battle! Vs. Gym Leader Aloe!!); Transliteration: "Shippō Jimu Ikusa! Tai Jimu Rīdā Aroe!!" (Japanese: シッポウジム戦！VSジムリーダー・アロエ！！)	January 6, 2011	May 14, 2011
675	669	16	"Rematch at the Nacrene Gym!" (Shippō Gym Rematch! The Explosive New Moves!!); Transliteration: "Saisen Shippō Jimu! Shin Waza Sakuretsu!!" (Japanese: 再戦シッポウジム！新技炸裂！！)	January 13, 2011	May 21, 2011
676	670	17	"Scraggy–Hatched to Be Wild!" (The Wild Child That Hatched From the Egg!); Transliteration: "Tamago kara Kaetta Abarenbō!" (Japanese: タマゴからかえったあばれん坊！)	January 20, 2011	May 28, 2011
677	671	18	"Sewaddle and Burgh in Pinwheel Forest!" (Yaguruma Forest! Kurumiru and Arti!!); Transliteration: "Yaguruma no Mori! Kurumiru to Āti!!" (Japanese: ヤグルマの森！クルミルとアーティ！！)	January 27, 2011	June 4, 2011
678	672	19	"A Connoisseur's Revenge!" (Sommelier Showdown! Ishizumai vs. Futachimaru!!); Transliteration: "Somurie Taiketsu! Ishizumai Tai Futachimaru!!" (Japanese: ソムリエ対決！イシズマイVSフタチマル！！)	February 17, 2011	June 11, 2011
679	673	20	"Dancing with the Ducklett Trio!" (Pikachu vs. Meguroco vs. Koaruhie!!); Transliteration: "Pikachū Tai Meguroko Tai Koaruhī!!" (Japanese: ピカチュウVSメグロコVSコアルヒー！！)	February 24, 2011	June 18, 2011
680	674	21	"The Lost World of Gothitelle!" (Skyarrow Bridge and Gothiruselle!); Transliteration: "Sukai Arō Burijji to Gochiruzeru!" (Japanese: スカイアローブリッジとゴチルゼル！)	March 3, 2011	June 25, 2011
681	675	22	"A Venipede Stampede!" (Hiun City! Fushide Panic!!); Transliteration: "Hiun Shiti! Fushide Panikku!" (Japanese: ヒウンシティ！フシデパニック！！)	March 10, 2011	July 2, 2011
N/A	N/A	N/A	"Team Rocket vs. Team Plasma! (Part 1)"; Transliteration: "Roketto-dan Tai Purazuma-dan! (Zenpen)" (Japanese: ロケット団VSプラズマ団！（前編）)	N/A (Note: Due to the 2011 earthquake and tsunami, the broadcasts of these episodes have been indefinitely postponed in Japan and the United States. The episodes were supposed to air on March 17 and 24, 2011, respectively, in Japan.)	N/A
N/A	N/A	N/A	"Team Rocket vs. Team Plasma! (Part 2)"; Transliteration: "Roketto-dan Tai Purazuma-dan! (Kōhen)" (Japanese: ロケット団VSプラズマ団！（後編）)	N/A	N/A
682	676	23	"Battling for the Love of Bug-Types!" (Hiun Gym Battle! The Pure-of-Heart Bug Pokémon Battle!); Transliteration: "Hiun Jimu Sen! Junjō Hāto no Mushi Pokemon Batoru!!" (Japanese: ヒウンジム戦！純情ハートの虫ポケモンバトル！！)	March 17, 2011	July 9, 2011
683	677	24	"Emolga the Irresistible!" (Beware Cute Faces! Paralyzing Emonga!!); Transliteration: "Kawaii Kao ni Yōchūi! Emonga de Shibirebire!!" (Japanese: かわいい顔に要注意！エモンガでシビレビレ！！)	March 24, 2011	July 16, 2011
684	678	25	"Emolga and the New Volt Switch!" (Emonga vs. Tsutarja! Volt Change Chaos!!); Transliteration: "Emonga Tai Tsutāja! Boruto Chenji de Daikonran!!" (Japanese: エモンガVSツタージャ！ボルトチェンジで大混乱！！)	March 31, 2011	July 23, 2011
685	679	26	"Scare at the Litwick Mansion!" (The Scary Story of the Hitomoshi Mansion!); Transliteration: "Hitomoshi Yashiki no Kowa~i Ohanashi!" (Japanese: ヒトモシ屋敷のこわ～いお話！)	April 7, 2011	July 30, 2011
686	680	27	"The Dragon Master's Path!" (The Road to Becoming a Dragon Master! Kibago vs. Crimgan!!); Transliteration: "Doragon Masutā e no Michi! Kibago Tai Kurimugan!!" (Japanese: ドラゴンマスターへの道！キバゴVSクリムガン！！)	April 14, 2011	August 6, 2011
687	681	28	"Oshawott's Lost Scalchop!" (The Lost Hotachi! Mijumaru's Greatest Crisis!!); Transliteration: "Kieta Hotachi! Mijumaru Saidai no Kiki!!" (Japanese: 消えたホタチ！ミジュマル最大の危機！！)	April 21, 2011	August 13, 2011
688	682	29	"Cottonee in Love!" (The Monmen in Love Rides the Wind!); Transliteration: "Koisuru Monmen wa Kaze ni Notte!" (Japanese: 恋するモンメンは風に乗って！)	April 28, 2011	August 20, 2011
689	683	30	"A UFO for Elgyem!" (Ligray and the Unidentified Flying Object!); Transliteration: "Rigurē to Mikakunin Hikō Buttai!" (Japanese: リグレーと未確認飛行物体！)	May 5, 2011	August 27, 2011
690	684	31	"Ash and Trip's Third Battle!" (Rival Battle! Vanipeti and Dokkorā in the Fight!!); Transliteration: "Raibaru Batoru! Baniputchi, Dokkorā Sansen!!" (Japanese: ライバルバトル！バニプッチ、ドッコラー参戦！！)	May 12, 2011	September 3, 2011
691	685	32	"Facing Fear with Eyes Wide Open!" (Gamagaru, Maggyo! Battle at the Waterside!!); Transliteration: "Gamagaru, Maggyo! Mizube no Tatakai!!" (Japanese: ガマガル、マッギョ！水辺の戦い！！)	May 19, 2011	September 10, 2011
692	686	33	"Iris and Excadrill Against the Dragon Buster!" (The Dragon Buster Appears! Iris and Doryuzu!!); Transliteration: "Doragon Basutā Tōjō! Airisu to Doryūzu!!" (Japanese: ドラゴンバスター登場！アイリスとドリュウズ！！)	May 26, 2011	September 17, 2011
693	687	34	"Gotta Catch a Roggenrola!" (Dangoro! Fire the Luster Cannon!!); Transliteration: "Dangoro! Rasutā Kanon Hassha seyo!" (Japanese: ダンゴロ！ラスターカノン発射せよ！！)	June 2, 2011	September 24, 2011
694	688	35	"Where Did You Go, Audino?" (Sommelier Detective Dent! The Case of the Missing Tabunne!!); Transliteration: "Somurie Tantei Dento! Tabunne Shissō Jiken!!" (Japanese: ソムリエ探偵デント！タブンネ失踪事件！！)	June 9, 2011	October 1, 2011
695	689	36	"Archeops in the Modern World!" (Fossil Revival! Ancient Mysterious Bird Archeops!!); Transliteration: "Kaseki Fukkatsu! Kodai Kaichō Ākeosu!!" (Japanese: 化石復活！古代怪鳥アーケオス！！)	June 16, 2011	October 8, 2011
696	690	37	"A Fishing Connoisseur in a Fishy Competition!" (Fishing Sommelier Dent Appears!!); Transliteration: "Tsuri Somurie Dento Tōjō!!" (Japanese: 釣りソムリエ・デント登場！！)	June 23, 2011 (Note: Due to the 2011 earthquake and tsunami, the broadcast of this episode was postponed from its original April 7, 2011, airdate. The episode was originally titled "Hiun City Fishing Competition! Fishing Sommelier Dent Appears!!" (ヒウンシティのつり大会！釣りソムリエ・デント登場!!, Hiun Shiti no Tsuri Taikai! Tsuri Somurie Dento Tōjō!!), but to fit in with its new airdate, references to the setting of Hiun (Castelia) City were removed.)	October 15, 2011
697	691	38	"Movie Time! Zorua in 'The Legend of the Pokémon Knight'!" (Zorua the Movie! The Legend of the Pokémon Knight!); Transliteration: "Zoroa Za Mubi! Pokemon Naito no Densetsu!!" (Japanese: ゾロア・ザ・ムービー！ポケモンナイトの伝説！！)	June 30, 2011	October 22, 2011
698	692	39	"Reunion Battles in Nimbasa!" (Everyone Gathers! Don Battle!!); Transliteration: "Zen'in Shūgō! Don Batoru!!" (Japanese: 全員集合！ドンバトル！！)	July 7, 2011	October 29, 2011
699	693	40	"Cilan Versus Trip, Ash Versus Georgia!" (Fierce Fighting Don Battle! Tsutarja vs. Komatana!!); Transliteration: "Nettō Don Batoru! Tsutāja Tai Komatana!!" (Japanese: 熱闘ドンバトル！ツタージャVSコマタナ！！)	July 21, 2011	November 5, 2011
700	694	41	"The Club Battle Hearts of Fury: Emolga Versus Sawk!" (White Hot Don Battle! Emonga vs. Dageki!!); Transliteration: "Hakunetsu Don Batoru! Emonga Tai Dageki!!" (Japanese: 白熱ドンバトル！エモンガVSダゲキ！！)	August 4, 2011	November 12, 2011
701	695	42	"The Club Battle Finale: A Heroes Outcome!" (Deciding Match of the Don Battle! Satoshi Against Iris!!); Transliteration: "Kessen Don Batoru! Satoshi Tai Airisu!!" (Japanese: 決戦ドンバトル！サトシ対アイリス！！)	August 11, 2011	November 19, 2011
702	696	43	"Meowth's Scrafty Tactics!" (Meowgotiator Nyarth! Zuruzukin Persuasion Tactics!!); Transliteration: "Nyagoshiētā Nyāsu! Zuruzukin Setoku Sakusen!!" (Japanese: ニャゴシエーター・ニャース！ズルズキン説得作戦！！)	August 18, 2011	November 26, 2011
703	697	44	"Purrloin, Sweet or Sneaky?" (Beware of Choroneko! Nyarth and Mijumaru!!); Transliteration: "Choroneko ni Goyōjin! Nyāsu to Mijumaru!!" (Japanese: チョロネコに御用心！ニャースとミジュマル！！)	August 25, 2011	December 3, 2011
704	698	45	"Beheeyem, Duosion, and the Dream Thief!" (Ōbemu, Daburan, and the Dream Thief!); Transliteration: "Ōbemu to Daburan to Yume Dorobō!" (Japanese: オーベムとダブランと夢泥棒！)	September 1, 2011	December 10, 2011
705	699	46	"The Beartic Mountain Feud!" (Meowgotiator Nyarth! Breaking Through Tunbear's Forest!!); Transliteration: "Nyagoshiētā Nyāsu! Tsunbeā no Mori o Toppa seyo!!" (Japanese: ニャゴシエーター・ニャース！ツンベアーの森を突破せよ！！)	September 8, 2011	December 17, 2011
706	700	47	"Crisis from the Underground Up!" (Wild Run! Battle Subway!! (Part 1)); Transliteration: "Gekisō! Batoru Sabuwei!! (Zenpen)" (Japanese: 激走！バトルサブウェイ!! （前編）)	September 15, 2011	December 31, 2011
707	701	48	"Battle for the Underground!" (Wild Run! Battle Subway!! (Part 2)); Transliteration: "Gekisō! Batoru Sabuwei!! (Kōhen)" (Japanese: 激走！バトルサブウェイ!! （後編）)	September 15, 2011	January 7, 2012

=== Season 15: Black & White: Rival Destinies (2011–12) ===
Jap. overall	Eng. overall	No. in season	English title Japanese title	Original release date	English air date
708	702	1	"Enter Elesa, Electrifying Gym Leader!" (The Gym Leader is a Charisma Model! Kamitsure Appears!!); Transliteration: "Jimu Rīdā wa Karisuma Moderu! Kamisure Tōjō!!" (Japanese: ジムリーダーはカリスマモデル！カミツレ登場！！)	September 22, 2011	February 18, 2012
709	703	2	"Dazzling the Nimbasa Gym!" (Raimon Gym! Splendid Lightning Battle!!); Transliteration: "Raimon Jimu! Kareinaru Dengeki Batoru!!" (Japanese: ライモンジム！華麗なる電撃バトル！！)	September 29, 2011	February 25, 2012
710	704	3	"Lost at the Stamp Rally!" (Satoshi and Dent vs. the Subway Masters!); Transliteration: "Satoshi, Dento Tai Sabuwei Masutā!" (Japanese: サトシ、デントVSサブウェイマスター！)	October 6, 2011	March 3, 2012
711	705	4	"Ash Versus the Champion!" (Satoshi vs. Champion Adeku!); Transliteration: "Satoshi Tai Chanpion Adeku!" (Japanese: サトシVSチャンピオン・アデク！)	October 13, 2011	March 10, 2012
712	706	5	"A Maractus Musical!" (To the Other Side of the Rainbow! Musical Maracacchi!!); Transliteration: "Niji no Kanata e! Marakatchi de Myūjikaru!!" (Japanese: 虹の彼方へ！マラカッチでミュージカル！！)	October 27, 2011	March 17, 2012
713	707	6	"The Four Seasons of Sawsbuck!" (Mebukijika! Seasonal Line-Up!!); Transliteration: "Mebukijika! Shunkashūtō Seizoroi!!" (Japanese: メブキジカ！春夏秋冬勢揃い！！)	November 3, 2011	March 24, 2012
714	708	7	"Scraggy and the Demanding Gothita!" (Zuruggu and the Selfish Gothimu!); Transliteration: "Zuruggu to Wagamama Gochimu!" (Japanese: ズルッグとわがままゴチム！)	November 10, 2011	March 31, 2012
715	709	8	"The Lonely Deino!" (Iris and Monozu! Training at the Day Care!!); Transliteration: "Airisu to Monozu! Sodateya Shugyō!!" (Japanese: アイリスとモノズ！育て屋修行！！)	November 24, 2011	April 7, 2012
716	710	9	"The Mighty Accelguard to the Rescue!" (Happy Hero A☆gilder vs. Freege-Man!); Transliteration: "Kaiketsu A☆girudā Tai Furīji-Otoko!" (Japanese: 快傑ア☆ギルダーVSフリージ男！)	December 1, 2011	April 14, 2012
717	711	10	"A Call for Brotherly Love!" (Dent and Pod's Brother Battle! Baoppu vs. Yanappu!!); Transliteration: "Dento to Poddo Kyōdai Batoru! Baoppu Tai Yanappu!!" (Japanese: デントとポッド兄弟バトル！バオップVSヤナップ！！)	December 8, 2011	April 21, 2012
718	712	11	"Stopping the Rage of Legends!: Part 1" (Tornelos vs. Voltolos vs. Landlos! (Part 1)); Transliteration: "Torunerosu Tai Borutorosu Tai Randorosu! (Zenpen)" (Japanese: トルネロスVSボルトロスVSランドロス！（前編）)	December 15, 2011	April 28, 2012
719	713	12	"Stopping the Rage of Legends!: Part 2" (Tornelos vs. Voltolos vs. Landlos! (Part 2)); Transliteration: "Torunerosu Tai Borutorosu Tai Randorosu! (Kōhen)" (Japanese: トルネロスVSボルトロスVSランドロス！（後編）)	December 22, 2011	May 5, 2012
720	714	13	"Battling the King of the Mines!" (Underground Gym Battle! Vs. Yacon!!); Transliteration: "Chitei no Jimu Sen! Tai Yākon!!" (Japanese: 地底のジム戦！VSヤーコン！！)	January 5, 2012	May 12, 2012
721	715	14	"Crisis at Chargestone Cave!" (Bachuru, Dentula! Electric Rock Cave!!); Transliteration: "Bachuru, Denchura! Denkiishi no Horaana!!" (Japanese: バチュル、デンチュラ！電気石の洞穴！！)	January 12, 2012	May 19, 2012
722	716	15	"Evolution Exchange Excitement!" (The Trade Evolution! Chevargo and Agilder!!); Transliteration: "Tsūshin Kōkan Shinka! Shubarugo to Agirudā!!" (Japanese: 通信交換進化！シュバルゴとアギルダー！！)	January 19, 2012	May 26, 2012
723	717	16	"Explorers of the Hero's Ruin!" (The Ruins of the Black Hero! Symboler and Desukarn!!); Transliteration: "Kuroki Eiyū no Iseki! Shinborā to Desukān!!" (Japanese: 黒き英雄の遺跡！シンボラーとデスカーン！！)	January 26, 2012	June 2, 2012
724	718	17	"Battling the Bully!" (Double Battle! Pikachu and Waruvile vs. Pendror and Gamageroge!!); Transliteration: "Daburu Batoru! Pikachū, Warubiru Tai Pendorā, Gamageroge!!" (Japanese: ダブルバトル！ピカチュウ・ワルビルVSペンドラー・ガマゲロゲ！！)	February 2, 2012	June 9, 2012
725	719	18	"Baffling the Bouffalant!" (Afro is a GO! Buffalon is a NO!!); Transliteration: "Afuro de Gō! Baffuron wa Nō!!" (Japanese: アフロでGO！バッフロンはNO！！)	February 16, 2012	June 16, 2012
726	720	19	"Cilan Takes Flight!" (Fukiyose Gym's Air Battle! Challenger Dent!?); Transliteration: "Fukiyose Jimu no Ea Batoru! Chōsensha Dento!?" (Japanese: フキヨセジムのエアバトル！挑戦者デント！？)	February 23, 2012	June 23, 2012
727	721	20	"An Amazing Aerial Battle!" (Fukiyose Gym! Vs. Fūro Mid-Air Match!!); Transliteration: "Fukiyose Jimu! Tai Fūro Kūchū Kessen!!" (Japanese: フキヨセジム！VSフウロ空中決戦！！)	March 1, 2012	June 30, 2012
728	722	21	"Climbing the Tower of Success!" (Breakthrough Challenge!! Climb the Tower of Heaven!!); Transliteration: "Nankan Toppa!! Tenkū no Tō o Nobore!!" (Japanese: 難関突破！！天空の塔を登れ！！)	March 8, 2012	July 7, 2012
729	723	22	"The Clubsplosion Begins!" (The Donamite Begins! Zuruggu vs. Yanakkie!!); Transliteration: "Donnamaito Kaimaku! Zuruggu tai Yanakkī!!" (Japanese: ドンナマイト開幕！ズルッグＶＳヤナッキー！！)	March 15, 2012	July 14, 2012
730	724	23	"Search for the Clubultimate!" (The Continuing Donamite! Crimgan vs. Kirikizan!!); Transliteration: "Dondon Tsuzuku yo Donnamaito! Kurimugan tai Kirikizan!!" (Japanese: どんどん続くよドンナマイト！クリムガンＶＳキリキザン！！)	March 22, 2012	July 21, 2012
731	725	24	"A Clubsplosion of Excitement!" (The Burning Fights of Donamite! Kirikizan vs. Enbuoh!!); Transliteration: "Nettō Donnamaito! Kirikizan tai Enbuō!!" (Japanese: 熱闘ドンナマイト！キリキザンVSエンブオー！！)	March 29, 2012	July 28, 2012
732	726	25	"Commanding the Clubsplosion Crown!" (The Donamite Deciding Match! Nageki vs. Dageki!!); Transliteration: "Kessen Donnamaito! Nageki tai Dageki!!" (Japanese: 決戦ドンナマイト！ナゲキVSダゲキ！！)	April 5, 2012	August 4, 2012
733	727	26	"Battling the Leaf Thieves!" (Rescue Kibago! The Den of Durant!!); Transliteration: "Kibago Kyūshutsu! Aianto no Sōkutsu!!" (Japanese: キバゴ救出！アイアントの巣窟！！)	April 12, 2012	August 11, 2012
734	728	27	"A Restoration Confrontation!: Part 1" (The Fierce Fight at Mount Neji! Abagoura's Miracle!! (Part 1)); Transliteration: "Nejiyama no Gekitō! Abagōra no Kiseki!! (Zenpen)" (Japanese: ネジ山の激闘！アバゴーラの奇跡！！（前編）)	April 19, 2012	August 18, 2012
735	729	28	"A Restoration Confrontation!: Part 2" (The Fierce Fight at Mount Neji! Abagoura's Miracle!! (Part 2)); Transliteration: "Nejiyama no Gekitō! Abagōra no Kiseki!! (Kōhen)" (Japanese: ネジ山の激闘！アバゴーラの奇跡！！（後編）)	April 26, 2012	August 25, 2012
736	730	29	"Evolution by Fire!" (The Memory of Flames! Pokabu vs. Enbuoh!!); Transliteration: "Honō no Memorī! Pokabu tai Enbuō!!" (Japanese: 炎のメモリー！ポカブＶＳエンブオー！！)	May 3, 2012	September 1, 2012
737	731	30	"Guarding the Guardian of the Mountain!" (Hachiku Appears! Ulgamoth's Holy Mountain!!); Transliteration: "Hachiku Tōjō! Urugamosu no Seinaru Yama!!" (Japanese: ハチク登場！ウルガモスの聖なる山！！)	May 10, 2012	September 8, 2012
738	732	31	"Caution: Icy Battle Conditions!" (Sekka Gym Battle! The Icy Battlefield!!); Transliteration: "Sekka Jimu Sen! Kōri no Batorufīrudo!!" (Japanese: セッカジム戦！氷のバトルフィールド！！)	May 17, 2012	September 15, 2012
739	733	32	"Clash of the Connoisseurs!" (Pokémon Sommelier Showdown! Tasting Battle!!); Transliteration: "Pokemon Somurie Taiketsu! Teisutingu Batoru!!" (Japanese: ポケモンソムリエ対決！テイスティングバトル！！)	May 24, 2012	September 22, 2012
740	734	33	"Crisis at Ferroseed Research!" (Tesseed Institute! Airis and Bivanilla!!); Transliteration: "Tesshīdo Kenkyūjo! Airisu to Baibanira!!" (Japanese: テッシード研究所！アイリスとバイバニラ！！)	May 31, 2012	September 29, 2012
741	735	34	"An Epic Defense Force!" (Movie Showdown! Sortie Out Isshu Defence Forces!!); Transliteration: "Eiga Taiketsu! Shutsugeki Isshu Bōeitai!!" (Japanese: 映画対決！出撃イッシュ防衛隊！！)	June 7, 2012	October 6, 2012
742	736	35	"Rocking the Virbank Gym!: Part 1" (Fierce Battle at Tachiwaki Gym! Vs. Homika!! (Part 1)); Transliteration: "Gekitō Tachiwaki Jimu! Bui Esu Homika!! (Zenpen)" (Japanese: 激闘タチワキジム！VSホミカ！！（前編）)	June 14, 2012	October 13, 2012
743	737	36	"Rocking the Virbank Gym!: Part 2" (Fierce Battle at Tachiwaki Gym! Vs. Homika!! (Part 2)); Transliteration: "Gekitō Tachiwaki Jimu! Bui Esu Homika!! (Kōhen)" (Japanese: 激闘タチワキジム！VSホミカ！！（後編）)	June 14, 2012	October 20, 2012
744	738	37	"All for the Love of Meloetta!" (Sing Meloetta! Love's Melody!!); Transliteration: "Utae Meroetta! Ai no Senritsu!!" (Japanese: 歌えメロエッタ！愛の旋律！！)	June 21, 2012 (Note: This episode began Best Wishes! Season 2 in Japan.)	October 27, 2012
745	739	38	"Piplup, Pansage, and a Meeting of the Times!" (Pochama vs. Yanappu! The Magnificent Battle!!); Transliteration: "Potchama Tai Yanappu! Karei naru Batoru!!" (Japanese: ポッチャマＶＳヤナップ！華麗なるバトル！！)	June 28, 2012	November 3, 2012
746	740	39	"Expedition to Onix Island!" (Survival on the Island of Iwark!); Transliteration: "Iwāku no Shima de Sabaibaru!" (Japanese: イワークの島でサバイバル！)	July 5, 2012	November 10, 2012
747	741	40	"The Mystery of the Missing Cubchoo!" (Sommelier Detective Dent! The Mystery of the Missing Kumasyun!!); Transliteration: "Somurie Tantei Dento! Kieta Kumashun no Nazo!!" (Japanese: ソムリエ探偵デント！消えたクマシュンの謎！！)	July 19, 2012	November 17, 2012
748	742	41	"Iris and the Rogue Dragonite!" (Iris and the Roughneck Kairyu!); Transliteration: "Airisu to Abaremono Kairyū!" (Japanese: アイリスと暴れ者カイリュー！)	July 26, 2012	November 24, 2012
749	743	42	"Jostling for the Junior Cup!" (Junior Cup Opener! Kairyu vs. Tunbear!!); Transliteration: "Junia Kappu Kaimaku! Kairyū tai Tsunbeā!!" (Japanese: ジュニアカップ開幕！カイリューＶＳツンベアー！！)	August 2, 2012	December 1, 2012
750	744	43	"Battling Authority Once Again!" (Power Battle! Iris vs. Hikari!!); Transliteration: "Pawā Batoru! Airisu tai Hikari!!" (Japanese: パワーバトル！アイ リスＶＳヒカリ！！)	August 23, 2012	December 8, 2012
751	745	44	"Ash, Iris, and Trip: Then There Were Three!" (Satoshi, Iris, and Shooty! The Last Battle!!); Transliteration: "Satoshi, Airisu, Shūtī! Saigo no Batoru!!" (Japanese: サトシ、アイリス、シューティー！最後のバトル！！)	August 30, 2012	December 15, 2012
752	746	45	"Goodbye, Junior Cup - Hello Adventure!" (The Hellos and Goodbyes of the Junior Cup!); Transliteration: "Wakare to Deai no Junia Kappu!" (Japanese: 別れと出会いのジュニアカップ！)	September 6, 2012	December 22, 2012
753	747	46	"The Road to Humilau!" (Seigaiha Gym Battle! Mantain vs. Daikenki!!); Transliteration: "Seigaiha Jimu Sen! Mantain tai Daikenki!!" (Japanese: セイガイハジム戦！マンタインＶＳダイケンキ！！)	September 13, 2012	January 5, 2013
754	748	47	"Unrest at the Nursery!" (Big Fuss at the Pokémon Daycare! Washibon and Vulchai!); Transliteration: "Pokemon Hoikuen wa Ōsawagi! Washibon to Baruchai!" (Japanese: ポケモン保育園は大騒ぎ！ワシボンとバルチャイ！)	September 20, 2012	January 12, 2013
755	749	48	"Meloetta and the Undersea Temple!" (Meloetta and the Undersea Temple!); Transliteration: "Meroetta to Kaitei no Shinden!" (Japanese: メロエッタと海底の神殿！)	September 27, 2012	January 19, 2013
756	750	49	"Unova's Survival Crisis!" (The Therian Formes Advance! Isshu's Greatest Crisis!!); Transliteration: "Reijū Forumu Sōshingeki! Isshu Saidai no Kiki!!" (Japanese: 霊獣フォルム総進撃！イッシュ最大の危機！！)	October 4, 2012	January 26, 2013

=== Season 16: Black & White: Adventures in Unova and Beyond (2012–13) ===
Jap. overall	Eng. overall	No. in season	English title Japanese title	Original release date	English air date
Pokémon: Black & White: Adventures in Unova
757	751	1	"Beauties Battling for Pride and Prestige!" (The World's Most Magnificent Pokémon!? Chillaccino vs. Tsutarja!); Transliteration: "Sekaiichi Karei na Pokemon!? Chirachīno tai Tsutāja!" (Japanese: 世界一華麗なポケモン！？チラチーノVSツタージャ！)	October 11, 2012	February 2, 2013
758	752	2	"A Surface to Air Tag Battle Team!" (A Sky and Earth Tag Battle!); Transliteration: "Ōzora to Daichi no Taggu Batoru!" (Japanese: 大空と大地のタッグバトル！)	October 18, 2012	February 9, 2013
759	753	3	"A Village Homecoming!" (Iris Returns to the Dragon Village!); Transliteration: "Airisu, Ryū no Sato e Kaeru!" (Japanese: アイリス、竜の里へ帰る！)	October 25, 2012	February 16, 2013
760	754	4	"Drayden Versus Iris: Past, Present, and Future!" (Sōryū Gym! Iris vs. Shaga!!); Transliteration: "Sōryū Jimu! Airisu tai Shaga!!" (Japanese: ソウリュウジム！アイリスVSシャガ！！)	November 8, 2012	February 23, 2013
761	755	5	"Team Eevee and the Pokémon Rescue Squad!" (Dispatch Team Eevee! Pokémon Rescue Squad!!); Transliteration: "Chīmu Ībui Shutsudō seyo! Pokemon Resukyū Tai!!" (Japanese: チーム・イーブイ出動せよ！ポケモンレスキュー隊！！)	November 15, 2012	March 2, 2013
762	756	6	"Curtain Up, Unova League!" (The Isshu League Higaki Tournament Begins! Satoshi Against Shooty!!); Transliteration: "Kaimaku: Isshu Rīgu Higaki Taikai! Satoshi tai Shūtī!!" (Japanese: 開幕 イッシュリーグ・ヒガキ大会！サトシ対シューティー！！)	November 22, 2012	March 9, 2013
763	757	7	"Mission: Defeat Your Rival!" (Fierce Fighting! The Rival Battle Leads to Victory!!); Transliteration: "Nettō! Raibaru Batoru o Kachinuke!!" (Japanese: 熱闘！ライバルバトルを勝ちぬけ！！)	November 29, 2012	March 16, 2013
764	758	8	"Lost at the League!" (Kibago Gets Lost!); Transliteration: "Kibago Maigo ni Naru!" (Japanese: キバゴ迷子になる！)	December 6, 2012	March 23, 2013
765	759	9	"Strong Strategy Steals the Show!" (Dageki Appears! Satoshi Against Kenyan!!); Transliteration: "Dageki Tōjō! Satoshi tai Keniyan!!" (Japanese: ダゲキ登場！サトシ対ケニヤン！！)	December 13, 2012	March 30, 2013
766	760	10	"Cameron's Secret Weapon!" (Satoshi Against Kotetsu! The Secret Weapon Sazandora!!); Transliteration: "Satoshi tai Kotetsu! Himitsu Heiki Sazandora!!" (Japanese: サトシ対コテツ！秘密兵器サザンドラ！！)	December 20, 2012	April 6, 2013
767	761	11	"A Unova League Evolution!" (The Isshu League Ends! Pikachu Against Lucario!!); Transliteration: "Ketchaku Isshu Rīgu! Pikachū tai Rukario!!" (Japanese: 決着イッシュリーグ！ピカチュウ対ルカリオ！！)	January 10, 2013	April 13, 2013
768	762	12	"New Places... Familiar Faces!" (Araragi Laboratory! A New Journey!!); Transliteration: "Araragi Kenkyūjo! Aratanaru Tabidachi!!" (Japanese: アララギ研究所！新たなる旅立ち！！)	January 17, 2013	April 20, 2013
769	763	13	"The Name's N!" (Friend... His Name Is N!); Transliteration: "Tomodachi... Sono Na wa Enu!" (Japanese: トモダチ…その名はN！)	January 24, 2013	April 27, 2013
770	764	14	"There's a New Gym Leader in Town!" (The New Gym Leader Cheren!); Transliteration: "Shin Jimu Rīdā Cheren!" (Japanese: 新ジムリーダー・チェレン！)	January 31, 2013	May 4, 2013
771	765	15	"Team Plasma's Pokémon Power Plot!" (Achroma vs. Handsome! The Team Plasma Conspiracy!!); Transliteration: "Akuroma tai Hansamu! Purasuma-dan no Inbō!!" (Japanese: アクロマVSハンサム！プラズマ団の陰謀！！)	February 7, 2013	May 11, 2013
772	766	16	"The Light of Floccesy Ranch!" (The Fog of Sangi Ranch! Denryu's Light!!); Transliteration: "Kiri no Sangi Bokujō! Denryū no Akari!!" (Japanese: 霧のサンギ牧場！デンリュウのあかり！！)	February 14, 2013	May 18, 2013
773	767	17	"Saving Braviary!" (N Returns! Warrgle Rescue Mission!!); Transliteration: "Enu Futatabi! Wōguru Kyūshutsu Sakusen!!" (Japanese: N再び！ウォーグル救出作戦！！)	February 21, 2013	May 25, 2013
774	768	18	"The Pokémon Harbor Patrol!" (Hurry Up! The Pokémon Coastal Rescue Team!!); Transliteration: "Isoge! Pokemon Wangan Kyūjotai!!" (Japanese: 急げ！ポケモン湾岸救助隊！！)	February 28, 2013	June 1, 2013
775	769	19	"The Fires of a Red-Hot Reunion!" (Burn, Lizardon! Vs. Kairyu!); Transliteration: "Moe yo Rizādon! Bui Esu Kairyū!" (Japanese: 燃えよリザードン！VSカイリュー！)	March 7, 2013	June 8, 2013
776	770	20	"Team Plasma's Pokémon Manipulation!" (Team Plasma's Ambitions! Manipulated Pokémon!!); Transliteration: "Purazuma-dan no Yabō! Ayatsurareta Pokemon-tachi!!" (Japanese: プラズマ団の野望！操られたポケモンたち！！)	March 14, 2013	June 15, 2013
777	771	21	"Secrets From Out of the Fog!" (N's Secret... Beyond the Fog!); Transliteration: "Enu no Himitsu... Kiri no Kanata ni!" (Japanese: Nの秘密…霧の彼方に！)	March 21, 2013	June 22, 2013
778	772	22	"Meowth, Colress and Team Rivalry!" (Team Rocket vs. Team Plasma! Nyarth and Achroma!!); Transliteration: "Roketto-dan tai Purazuma-dan! Nyāsu to Akuroma!!" (Japanese: ロケット団VSプラズマ団！ニャースとアクロマ！！)	March 28, 2013	June 29, 2013
779	773	23	"Ash and N: A Clash of Ideals!" (The White Ruins! Satoshi Against N!!); Transliteration: "Shiro no Iseki! Satoshi tai Enu!!" (Japanese: 白の遺跡！サトシ対N！！)	April 4, 2013	July 6, 2013
780	774	24	"Team Plasma and the Awakening Ceremony!" (Team Plasma Attacks! The Resurrection Ceremony!!); Transliteration: "Purazuma-dan Shūgeki! Fukkatsu no Gishiki!!" (Japanese: プラズマ団襲撃！復活の儀式！！)	April 11, 2013	July 13, 2013
781	775	25	"What Lies Beyond Truth and Ideals!" (Reshiram Against N! Beyond Ideals and Truth!!); Transliteration: "Reshiramu tai Enu! Risō to Shinjitsu no Kanata e!!" (Japanese: レシラム対N！理想と真実の彼方へ！！)	April 18, 2013	July 20, 2013
Pokémon: Black & White: Adventures in Unova and Beyond
782	776	26	"Farewell, Unova! Setting Sail for New Adventures!" (Farewell Isshu! A New Journey Sets Sail!!); Transliteration: "Saraba Isshu! Aratanaru Funade!!" (Japanese: さらばイッシュ！新たなる船出！！)	April 25, 2013	July 27, 2013
783	777	27	"Danger, Sweet as Honey!" (Sweet Honey Is Full of Danger!); Transliteration: "Amai Hanīmitsu ni wa Kiken ga Ippai!" (Japanese: 甘いハニーミツには危険がいっぱい！)	May 2, 2013	August 3, 2013
784	778	28	"Cilan and the Case of the Purrloin Witness!" (Sommelier Detective Dent! The Secret Room on the Open Seas!!); Transliteration: "Somurie Tantei Dento! Daikaigen no Misshitsu!!" (Japanese: ソムリエ探偵デント！大海原の密室！！)	May 9, 2013	August 10, 2013
785	779	29	"Crowning the Scalchop King!" (Farewell Mijumaru!? The Path to Be Hotachi King!); Transliteration: "Saraba Mijumaru!? Hotachi Kingu e no Michi!" (Japanese: さらばミジュマル！？ホタチキングへの道！)	May 16, 2013	August 17, 2013
786	780	30	"The Island of Illusions!" (Illusion Island! The Zoroark in the Fog!!); Transliteration: "Gen'ei no Shima! Kiri no Naka no Zoroāku!!" (Japanese: 幻影の島！霧の中のゾロアーク！！)	May 23, 2013	August 24, 2013
787	781	31	"To Catch a Rotom!" (Rotom vs. Professor Ōkido!); Transliteration: "Rotomu Bui Esu Ōkido-hakase!" (Japanese: ロトムVSオーキド博士！)	May 30, 2013	August 31, 2013
788	782	32	"The Pirates of Decolore!" (Pirate King of the Dekorora Islands!); Transliteration: "Dekorora Shotō no Kaizoku Ō!" (Japanese: デコロラ諸島の海賊王！)	June 6, 2013	September 7, 2013
789	783	33	"Butterfree and Me!" (Satoshi and Butterfree! Until We Meet Again!!); Transliteration: "Satoshi to Batafurī! Mata Au Hi made!!" (Japanese: サトシとバタフリー！また会う日まで！！)	June 13, 2013	September 14, 2013
790	784	34	"The Path That Leads to Goodbye!" (Satoshi and Iris No Longer Friends!? The Single Path of Separation!!); Transliteration: "Satoshi to Airisu ga Zekkō!? Wakare no Ippon-michi!!" (Japanese: サトシとアイリスが絶交！？別れの1本道！！)	June 20, 2013	September 21, 2013
791	785	35	"Searching for a Wish!" (Make a Wish on Jirachi! The Seven-Day Miracle!!); Transliteration: "Jirāchi ni Negai o! Nanokakan no Kiseki!!" (Japanese: ジラーチに願いを！七日間の奇跡！！)	June 27, 2013	September 28, 2013
792	786	36	"Capacia Island UFO!" (The Shining Flying Saucer! The Town of Ohbem!!); Transliteration: "Hikaru Enban! Ōbemu-tachi no Machi!!" (Japanese: 光る円盤！オーベムたちの街！！)	July 4, 2013	October 5, 2013
793	787	37	"The Journalist from Another Region!" (Pansy Appears! Erikiteru and Gogoat!!); Transliteration: "Panjī Tōjō! Erikiteru to Gōgōto!!" (Japanese: パンジー登場！エリキテルとゴーゴート！！)	July 18, 2013	October 12, 2013
794	788	38	"Mystery on a Deserted Island!" (The Mystery of the Treasure! Desert Island Adventure!!); Transliteration: "Otakara no Nazo! Mujintō Adobenchā!!" (Japanese: お宝の謎！無人島アドベンチャー！！)	July 25, 2013	October 19, 2013
795	789	39	"A Pokémon of a Different Color!" (Ibuki and Iris! The Different Colored Crimgan!!); Transliteration: "Ibuki to Airisu! Irochigai Kurimugan!!" (Japanese: イブキとアイリス！色ちがいクリムガン！！)	August 1, 2013	October 26, 2013
796	790	40	"Celebrating the Hero's Comet!" (Onvern Appears! The Legend of the Comet and the Hero!!); Transliteration: "Onbān Tōjō! Suisei to Yūsha no Densetsu!!" (Japanese: オンバーン登場！彗星と勇者の伝説！！)	August 15, 2013	November 2, 2013
797	791	41	"Go, Go, Gogoat!" (Go Go Gogoat!); Transliteration: "Gō Gō Gōgōto!" (Japanese: ゴーゴーゴーゴート！)	August 22, 2013	November 9, 2013
798	792	42	"Team Rocket's Shocking Recruit!" (Emonga Joins Team Rocket!); Transliteration: "Emonga, Rokketo-dan ni Hairu!" (Japanese: エモンガ、ロケット団に入る！)	September 5, 2013	November 16, 2013
799	793	43	"Survival of the Striaton Gym!" (Dent vs. the Icy Challenger! The San'yō Gym in Danger!!); Transliteration: "Dento Bui Esu Kōri no Chōsensha! San'yō Jimu no Kiki!!" (Japanese: デントVS氷の挑戦者！サンヨウジムの危機！！)	September 12, 2013	November 23, 2013
800	794	44	"Best Wishes Until We Meet Again!" (Best Wishes! Until the Day We Meet Again!!); Transliteration: "Besuto Uisshu! Mata Au Hi made!!" (Japanese: ベストウイッシュ！また会う日まで！！)	September 19, 2013	November 30, 2013
801	795	45	"The Dream Continues!" (My Dream, Pokémon Master!!); Transliteration: "Ore no Yume, Pokemon Masutā!!" (Japanese: オレの夢、ポケモンマスター！！)	September 26, 2013	December 7, 2013

Jap. overall	Eng. overall	No. in season	English title Japanese title	Original release date	English air date
—	—	—	"Mewtwo — Prologue to Awakening" (Myūtsū: The Prologue to its Awakening); Transliteration: "Myūtsū ~Kakusei e no Purorōgu~" (Japanese: ミュウツー ～覚醒への序章（プロローグ）～)	July 11, 2013	January 11, 2014
SP–3	—	SP–1	"Dent and Takashi! Gyarados's Outrage!!" (Note: These episodes are labeled as "extra episodes" in Japan, but were broadcast under the Decolora Adventures title and are included within this season.); Transliteration: "Dento to Takeshi! Gyaradosu no Gekirin!!" (Japanese: デントとタケシ！ギャラドスのげきりん！！)	October 3, 2013	—
SP–4	—	SP–2	"Iris vs. Ibuki! The Path to Becoming a Dragon Master!!"; Transliteration: "Airisu Bui Esu Ibuki! Doragon Masutā e no Michi!!" (Japanese: アイリスVSイブキ！ドラゴンマスターへの道！！)	March 27, 2014	—

=== Season 17: XY (2013–14) ===
Jap. overall (Note: The English episode numbers are based on their first airing in the United States in syndication on Cartoon Network. Other English-speaking nations largely follow either this order or the Japanese order.)	Eng. overall	No. in season	English title Japanese title	Original release date	English air date
802	796	1	"Kalos, Where Dreams and Adventures Begin!" (Let's Go to the Kalos Region! The Beginning of Dreams and Adventures!!); Transliteration: "Karosu-chihō ni Yattekita! Yume to Bōken no Hajimari!!" (Japanese: カロス地方にやってきた！夢と冒険のはじまり！！)	October 17, 2013	January 18, 2014 (Note: These episodes were broadcast in the United States on October 19, 2013, as a special sneak peek at the upcoming season which had recently begun broadcast in Japan.)
803	797	2	"Lumiose City Pursuit!" (Mega Evolution and the Prism Tower!); Transliteration: "Mega Shinka to Purizumu Tawā!" (Japanese: メガシンカとプリズムタワー！)	October 17, 2013	January 25, 2014
804	798	3	"A Battle of Aerial Mobility!" (Keromatsu vs. Yayakoma! The Aerial Battle!!); Transliteration: "Keromatsu Bui Esu Yayakoma! Kūchūkidō Batoru!!" (Japanese: ケロマツVSヤヤコマ！空中機動バトル！！)	October 24, 2013	February 1, 2014
805	799	4	"A Shockingly Cheeky Friendship!" (Pikachu and Dedenne! Nuzzle!!); Transliteration: "Pikachū to Dedenne! Hoppesurisuri!!" (Japanese: ピカチュウとデデンネ！ほっぺすりすり！！)	October 31, 2013	February 8, 2014
806	800	5	"A Blustery Santalune Gym Battle!" (The Hakudan Gym Battle! The Magnificent Viviyon's Dance Battle!!); Transliteration: "Hakudan Jimu Sen! Kareinaru Bibiyon no Mai Batoru!!" (Japanese: ハクダンジム戦！華麗なるビビヨンの舞バトル！！)	November 7, 2013	February 15, 2014
807	801	6	"Battling on Thin Ice!" (The Icy Rematch! Pikachu vs. Viviyon!!); Transliteration: "Hyōjō Kessen! Pikachū Tai Bibiyon!!" (Japanese: 氷上決戦！ピカチュウVSビビヨン！！)	November 14, 2013	February 22, 2014
808	802	7	"Giving Chase at the Rhyhorn Race!" (Leave it to Serena!? The Wild Sihorn Race!); Transliteration: "Serena ni Omakase!? Gekisō Saihōn Rēsu!" (Japanese: セレナにおまかせ！？激走サイホーンレース！)	November 21, 2013	March 1, 2014
809	803	8	"Grooming Furfrou!" (The Pokémon Trimmer and Trimmian!); Transliteration: "Pokémon Torimā to Torimian!" (Japanese: ポケモントリマーとトリミアン！)	November 28, 2013	March 8, 2014
810	804	9	"Clemont's Got a Secret!" (Capture Miare Gym! Citron's Secret!!); Transliteration: "Miare Jimu Kōryaku! Shitoron no Himitsu!!" (Japanese: ミアレジム攻略！シトロンの秘密！！)	December 5, 2013	March 15, 2014
811	805	10	"Mega-Mega Meowth Madness!" (Harimaron vs. Mega Mega Nyarth!!); Transliteration: "Harimaron Tai Mega Mega Nyāsu!!" (Japanese: ハリマロンVSメガメガニャース！！)	December 12, 2013	March 22, 2014
812	806	11	"The Bamboozling Forest!" (The Bamboo Forest Chase! Yancham and Goronda!!); Transliteration: "Chikurin no Tsuiseki! Yanchamu to Goronda!!" (Japanese: 竹林の追跡！ヤンチャムとゴロンダ！！)	December 19, 2013	March 29, 2014
813	807	12	"To Catch a Pokémon Smuggler!" (Capture the Pokémon Buyer! The Kofuurai Impersonation Plan!!); Transliteration: "Pokémon Baiyā wo Tsukamero! Kofūrai Gisō Sakusen!!" (Japanese: ポケモンバイヤーを捕まえろ！コフーライ偽装作戦！！)	January 9, 2014	April 5, 2014
814	808	13	"Kindergarten Chaos!" (Nymphia vs. Keromatsu! Kindergarten Chaos!!); Transliteration: "Ninfia Tai Keromatsu! Yōchien wa Ōsawagi!!" (Japanese: ニンフィアVSケロマツ！幼稚園は大さわぎ！！)	January 16, 2014	April 12, 2014
815	809	14	"Seeking Shelter From the Storm!" (The Spooky Shelter! Nyasper Is Watching!!); Transliteration: "Bukimi na Amayadori! Nyasupā wa Miteita!!" (Japanese: ぶきみな雨宿り！ニャスパーは見ていた！！)	January 30, 2014	April 19, 2014
816	810	15	"An Appetite for Battle!" (Harimaron vs. Mafoxy! A Diet Battle!?); Transliteration: "Harimaron Bui Esu Mafokushī! Daietto Batoru!?" (Japanese: ハリマロンVSマフォクシー！ダイエットバトル！？)	February 6, 2014	April 26, 2014
817	811	16	"A Jolting Switcheroo!" (Dedenne Is Pichu and Pichu Is Dedenne...!?); Transliteration: "Dedenne ga Pichū de Pichū ga Dedenne de...!?" (Japanese: デデンネがピチューでピチューがデデンネで...！？)	February 13, 2014	May 3, 2014
818	812	17	"A Rush of Ninja Wisdom!" (Keromatsu Against Gekogahshier! Ninja Battle!!); Transliteration: "Keromatsu Tai Gekogashira! Ninja Batoru!!" (Japanese: ケロマツ対ゲコガシラ！忍者バトル！！)	February 20, 2014	May 10, 2014
819	813	18	"Awakening the Sleeping Giant!" (Wake Up Kabigon! It's a Battle in the Parfum Palace!!); Transliteration: "Kabigon o Okose! Parufamu Kyūden de Batoru Desu!!" (Japanese: カビゴンを起こせ！パルファム宮殿でバトルです！！)	February 27, 2014	May 17, 2014
820	814	19	"A Conspiracy to Conquer!" (The Conspiracy of Madame X! The Calamanero of Fear!!); Transliteration: "Madamu Ekkusu no Inbō! Kyōfu no Karamanero!!" (Japanese: マダムXの陰謀！恐怖のカラマネロ！！)	March 13, 2014	May 24, 2014
821	815	20	"Breaking Titles at the Chateau!" (Challenge the Battle Chateau! Viola vs. Zakuro!!); Transliteration: "Chōsen Batoru Shatō! Biora Bui Esu Zakuro!!" (Japanese: 挑戦バトルシャトー！ビオラVSザクロ！！)	March 20, 2014	June 7, 2014
822	816	21	"A PokéVision of Things to Come!" (It's a Debut! Serena and Fokko's PokéVision!!); Transliteration: "Debyū desu! Serena to Fokko de Pokebijon!!" (Japanese: デビューです！セレナとフォッコでポケビジョン！！)	March 27, 2014	June 14, 2014
823	817	22	"Going for the Gold!" (Catch the Golden Koiking!); Transliteration: "Ōgon no Koikingu o Tsuriagero!!" (Japanese: 黄金のコイキングを釣り上げろ！！)	April 10, 2014	June 21, 2014
824	818	23	"Coming Back into the Cold!" (The Aurora Bonds! Amarus and Amaruruga!); Transliteration: "Ōrora no Kizuna! Amarurusu to Amaruruga!!" (Japanese: オーロラの絆！アマルスとアマルルガ！！)	April 17, 2014	June 28, 2014
825	819	24	"Climbing the Walls!" (Shōyō Gym Battle! Pikachu Against Chigoras!!); Transliteration: "Shōyō Jimu-sen! Pikachū Tai Chigorasu!!" (Japanese: ショウヨウジム戦！ピカチュウ対チゴラス！！)	April 24, 2014	July 5, 2014
826	820	25	"A Battle by Any Other Name!" (Peroppafu and Peroream!! The Sweet Battle Isn't Sweet!?); Transliteration: "Peroppafu to Perorīmu!! Amai Tatakai wa Amakunai!?" (Japanese: ペロッパフとペロリーム！！甘い戦いはあまくない！？)	May 8, 2014	July 12, 2014
827	821	26	"To Find a Fairy Flower!" (Flabébé and the Fairy Flower!); Transliteration: "Furabebe to Yōsei no Hana" (Japanese: フラベベと妖精の花！)	May 15, 2014	July 19, 2014
828	822	27	"The Bonds of Evolution!" (Champion Carnet Appears! The Mega Sirknight in the Fog!!); Transliteration: "Chanpion Karune Tōjō! Kiri no Naka no Mega Sānaito!!" (Japanese: チャンピオン・カルネ登場！霧の中のメガサーナイト！！)	May 22, 2014	July 26, 2014
829	823	28	"Heroes - Friends and Faux Alike!" (Ta-Da! The Fake Satoshi Appears!!); Transliteration: "Jajān! Nise Satoshi Arawareru!!" (Japanese: ジャジャーン！ニセ サトシ現る！！)	May 29, 2014 (Note: These episodes were broadcast as part of an hour-long special.)	August 2, 2014
830	824	29	"Mega Revelations!" (Corni and Lucario! The Secrets of Mega Evolution!!); Transliteration: "Koruni to Rukario! Megashinka no Himitsu!!" (Japanese: コルニとルカリオ！メガシンカの秘密！！)	May 29, 2014	August 9, 2014
831	825	30	"The Cave of Trials!" (Lucario vs. Bursyamo! The Cave of Trials!!); Transliteration: "Rukario Tai Bashāmo! Shiren no Dōkutsu!!" (Japanese: ルカリオVSバシャーモ！試練の洞窟！！)	June 5, 2014	August 16, 2014
832	826	31	"The Aura Storm!" (Mega Lucario Against Mega Lucario! A Storm of Auras!!); Transliteration: "Mega Rukario Tai Mega Rukario! Hadō no Arashi!!" (Japanese: メガルカリオ対メガルカリオ！波導の嵐！！)	June 12, 2014	August 23, 2014
833	827	32	"Calling from Beyond the Aura!" (Call Out With Your Heart! Beyond the Aura!!); Transliteration: "Yobiau Kokoro! Hadō no Mukō e!!" (Japanese: 呼び合う心！波導のむこうへ！！)	June 19, 2014	August 30, 2014
834	828	33	"The Bonds of Mega Evolution!" (Mega Lucario Against Mega Kucheat! The Bonds of Mega Evolution!!); Transliteration: "Mega Rukario Tai Mega Kuchīto! Megashinka no Kizuna!!" (Japanese: メガルカリオ対メガクチート！メガシンカの絆！！)	July 3, 2014	September 6, 2014
835	829	34	"The Forest Champion!" (Champion of the Forest! Luchabull Appears!!); Transliteration: "Mori no Chanpion! Ruchaburu Tōjō!" (Japanese: 森のチャンピオン！ルチャブル登場！！)	July 10, 2014	September 13, 2014
836	830	35	"Battles in the Sky!" (Sky Battle!? Luchabull Against Fiarrow!!); Transliteration: "Sukai Batoru!? Ruchaburu Tai Faiarō!!" (Japanese: スカイバトル！？ルチャブル対ファイアロー！！)	July 24, 2014	September 20, 2014
837	831	36	"The Cave of Mirrors!" (Reflection Cave! Satoshi and the Satoshi of the Mirror Land!?); Transliteration: "Utsushimi no Dōkutsu! Kagami no Kuni no Satoshi to Satoshi!?" (Japanese: うつしみの洞窟！鏡の国のサトシとサトシ！？)	July 31, 2014	September 27, 2014
838	832	37	"Forging Forest Friendships!" (The Wriggling Forest of Ohrot!); Transliteration: "Ugomeku Mori no Ōrotto!" (Japanese: 蠢く森のオーロット！)	August 7, 2014	October 4, 2014
839	833	38	"Summer of Discovery!" (Pokémon Summer Camp! The Rival Trio Appears!!); Transliteration: "Pokémon Samā Kyanpu! Raibaru Sanningumi Tōjō!!" (Japanese: ポケモン・サマーキャンプ！ライバル三人組登場！！)	August 14, 2014	October 11, 2014
840	834	39	"Day Three Block Busters!" (Serena vs. Sana! PokéVision Showdown!!); Transliteration: "Serena Bui Esu Sana! Pokebijon Taiketsu!!" (Japanese: セレナVSサナ！ポケビジョン対決！！)	August 21, 2014	October 18, 2014
841	835	40	"Foggy Pokémon Orienteering!" (PokéEnteering! The X in the Fog!!); Transliteration: "Pokeentēringu! Kiri no Naka no Ekkusu!!" (Japanese: ポケエンテーリング！霧の中のX！！)	August 28, 2014	October 25, 2014
842	836	41	"Battling Into the Hall of Fame!" (Team Battle! The Hall of Fame Match!!); Transliteration: "Chīmu Batoru! Dentōiri Kessen!!" (Japanese: チームバトル！殿堂入り決戦！！)	September 4, 2014	November 1, 2014
843	837	42	"Origins of Mega Evolution!" (The Master Tower! The History of Mega Evolution!!); Transliteration: "Masutā Tawā! Megashinka no Rekishi!!" (Japanese: マスタータワー！メガシンカの歴史！！)	September 18, 2014	November 8, 2014
844	838	43	"Showdown at the Shalour Gym!" (Shara Gym Battle! Pikachu vs. Mega Lucario!!); Transliteration: "Shara Jimu Sen! Pikachū Bui Esu Mega Rukario!!" (Japanese: シャラジム戦！ピカチュウVSメガルカリオ！！)	September 25, 2014	November 15, 2014
845	839	44	"Splitting Heirs!" (Citron Against Eureka!? The Nyaonix Sibling Battle!!); Transliteration: "Shitoron Tai Yurīka!? Nyaonikusu de Kyōdai Batoru!!" (Japanese: シトロン対ユリーカ！？ニャオニクスできょうだいバトル！！)	October 2, 2014	November 22, 2014
846	840	45	"The Clumsy Crier Quiets the Chaos!" (The Clutzy Pukurin vs. the Berserk Bohmander!!); Transliteration: "Dojikko Pukurin Bui Esu Bōsō Bōmanda!!" (Japanese: どじっこプクリンVS暴走ボーマンダ！！)	October 9, 2014	November 29, 2014
847	841	46	"Dreaming a Performer's Dream!" (Serena's First Capture!? Yancham vs. Fokko!!); Transliteration: "Serena, Hatsu Getto!? Yanchamu Bui Esu Fokko!!" (Japanese: セレナ、初ゲット！？ヤンチャムVSフォッコ！！)	October 16, 2014	December 6, 2014
848	842	47	"A Campus Reunion!" (Citron's Campus Memories! The Shocking Reunion!!); Transliteration: "Shitoron, Omoide no Kyanpasu! Dengeki no Saikai!!" (Japanese: シトロン、想い出のキャンパス！電撃の再会！！)	October 23, 2014	December 13, 2014
849	843	48	"Bonnie for the Defense!" (Send Out the Laplace Guard! Go For It Eureka!!); Transliteration: "Shutsudō Rapurasu Bōeitai! Yurīka Ganbaru!!" (Japanese: 出動ラプラス防衛隊！ユリーカがんばる！！)	October 30, 2014	December 20, 2014

Jap. overall	Eng. overall	No. in season	English title Japanese title	Original release date	English air date
SP–5	SP–1	SP–1	"Pokémon: Mega Evolution Special I" (The Strongest Mega Evolution: Act I); Transliteration: "Saikyō Mega Shinka ~Act I~" (Japanese: 最強メガシンカ～Act I～)	April 3, 2014	May 31, 2014

=== Season 18: XY: Kalos Quest (2014–15) ===
Jap. overall	Eng. overall	No. in season	English title Japanese title	Original release date	English air date
850	844	1	"Pathways to Performance Partnering!" (Dance, Yancham — Captivate, Fokko! The Dance for Tomorrow!!); Transliteration: "Odore Yanchamu, Misero Fokko! Ashita e no Suteppu!!" (Japanese: 踊れヤンチャム、魅せろフォッコ！明日へのステップ！！)	November 13, 2014	February 7, 2015
851	845	2	"An Undersea Place to Call Home!" (The Undersea Castle! Kuzumo and Dramidoro!!); Transliteration: "Kaitei no Shiro! Kuzumō to Doramidoro!!" (Japanese: 海底の城！クズモーとドラミドロ！！)	November 20, 2014 (Note: This episode is chronologically set before Ash's Gym battle with Grant in the XY episode "Climbing the Walls!" Due to the sinking of MV Sewol, the April 24, 2014, broadcast of this episode was delayed until November 20, 2014, due to its inclusion of a sunken ship.)	February 7, 2015
852	846	3	"When Light and Dark Collide!" (Luchabull and Dark Luchabull!); Transliteration: "Ruchaburu to Dāku Ruchaburu!" (Japanese: ルチャブルとダークルチャブル！)	November 27, 2014	February 7, 2015
853	847	4	"A Stealthy Challenge!" (Ninja Arts Showdown! Gekogashira VS Gamenodes!); Transliteration: "Ninpō Taiketsu! Gekogashira Tai Gamenodesu!!" (Japanese: 忍法対決！ゲコガシラ対ガメノデス！！)	December 11, 2014	February 28, 2015
854	848	5	"A Race for Home!" (Serena's Earnest! The Wild Meecle Race!!); Transliteration: "Serena no Honki! Gekisō Mēkuru Rēsu!" (Japanese: セレナの本気！激走メェークルレース！)	December 18, 2014	March 7, 2015
855	849	6	"Facing the Grand Design!" (Calamanero VS Maaiika! The Bonds that Would Save the World!!); Transliteration: "Karamanero Tai Māīka! Kizuna wa Sekai o Sukuu!!" (Japanese: カラマネロ対マーイーカ！絆は世界を救う！！)	December 25, 2014	March 14, 2015
856	850	7	"A Slippery Encounter!" (The Weakest Dragon!? Numera Appears!!); Transliteration: "Saijaku no Doragon!? Numera Tōjō!!" (Japanese: 最弱のドラゴン！？ヌメラ登場！！)	January 8, 2015	March 21, 2015
857	851	8	"One for the Goomy!" (Do Your Best, Dedenne! Do it for Numera!!); Transliteration: "Dedenne Ganbaru! Numera no Tame ni!!" (Japanese: デデンネがんばる！ヌメラのために！！)	January 15, 2015	March 28, 2015
858	852	9	"Thawing an Icy Panic!" (Vanipeti Panic! An Ice-Covered Whiteout!!); Transliteration: "Baniputchi Panikku! Howaitoauto wa Kōrigōri!!" (Japanese: バニプッチ・パニック！ホワイトアウトはこおりごおり！！)	January 22, 2015	April 4, 2015
859	853	10	"The Green, Green Grass Types of Home!" (Hiyoku Gym Battle! Gekogashira VS Gogoat!!); Transliteration: "Hiyoku Jimu Sen! Gekogashira Bui Esu Gōgōto!" (Japanese: ヒヨクジム戦！ゲコガシラVSゴーゴート！！)	January 29, 2015	April 11, 2015
860	854	11	"Under the Pledging Tree!" (Satoshi and Serena's First Date!? The Tree of Promises and the Presents!!); Transliteration: "Satoshi to Serena Hatsu Dēto!? Chikai no Ki to Purezento!!" (Japanese: サトシとセレナ初デート！？誓いの樹とプレゼント！！)	February 5, 2015	April 18, 2015
861	855	12	"A Showcase Debut!" (Aim to be the Kalos Queen! Serena Makes her Debut!!); Transliteration: "Mezase Karos Kwīn! Serena, Debyū Desu!!" (Japanese: 目指せカロスクィーン！セレナ、デビューです！！)	February 12, 2015	April 25, 2015
862	856	13	"An Oasis of Hope!" (Decisive Battle in the Wilderness! Fight, Numera!!); Transliteration: "Kōya no Kettō! Tatakae Numera!!" (Japanese: 荒野の決闘！戦えヌメラ！！)	February 19, 2015	May 2, 2015
863	857	14	"The Future Is Now, Thanks to Determination!" (Protect the Future of Science! The Electric Labyrinth!!); Transliteration: "Saiensu no Mirai o Mamore! Denki no Meikyū!!" (Japanese: サイエンスの未来を守れ！電気の迷宮！！)	February 26, 2015	May 9, 2015
864	858	15	"A Fork in the Road! A Parting of the Ways!" (A Fork in the Path of Indecision!? Musashi and Sonans!!); Transliteration: "Mayoimichi Wakaremichi!? Musashi to Sōnansu!!" (Japanese: 迷い道は分かれ道！？ムサシとソーナンス！！)	March 5, 2015	May 16, 2015
865	859	16	"Battling with Elegance And a Big Smile!" (Fokko VS Mahoxy! A Splendid Performance Battle!!); Transliteration: "Fokko VS Mafokushī! Karei Naru Pafōmansu Batoru!!" (Japanese: はフォッコVSマフォクシー！華麗なるパフォーマンスバトル！！)	March 12, 2015	May 23, 2015
866	860	17	"Good Friends, Great Training!" (Kameil and Raichu Appear! Good Luck Numeil!!); Transliteration: "Kamēru, Raichuu Tōjō! Numeiru Ganbaru!!" (Japanese: カメール、ライチュウ登場！ヌメイルがんばる！！)	March 26, 2015	May 30, 2015
867	861	18	"Confronting the Darkness!" (The Miare City Investigation! Citroid VS Black Citroid!!); Transliteration: "Miare Shiti Sōsasen! Shitoroido tai Burakku Shitoroido!!" (Japanese: ミアレシティ走査線！シトロイド対ブラック・シトロイド！！)	April 2, 2015	June 6, 2015
868	862	19	"The Moment of Lumiose Truth!" (Miare Gym Battle! Satoshi VS Citron!!); Transliteration: "Miare Jimu Sen! Satoshi VS Shitoron!!" (Japanese: ミアレジム戦！サトシVSシトロン！！)	April 9, 2015	June 13, 2015
869	863	20	"Garchomp's Mega Bond!" (The Coveted Mega Evolution! Gaburias's Bonds!!); Transliteration: "Neraware ta Megashinka! Gaburiasu no Kizuna!!" (Japanese: 狙われたメガシンカ！ガブリアスの絆！！)	April 16, 2015	June 20, 2015
870	864	21	"Defending the Homeland!" (Battle in the Wetlands! Numelgon VS Florges!!); Transliteration: "Shicchi tai no Tatakai! Numerugon tai Furājesu!!" (Japanese: 湿地帯の戦い！ヌメルゴン対フラージェス！！)	April 23, 2015	June 27, 2015
871	865	22	"Beyond the Rainbow!" (Conclusion! Numelgon, Go Over the Rainbow!!); Transliteration: "Kecchaku! Numerugon Niji no Kanata ni!!" (Japanese: 決着！ヌメルゴン虹の彼方に！！)	April 30, 2015	July 4, 2015
872	866	23	"So You're Having a Bad Day!" (The Worst Luck? Eureka VS Nyarth!!); Transliteration: "Unsei Saiaku? Yurīka tai Nyāsu!!" (Japanese: 運勢最悪? ユリーカ対ニャース！！)	May 7, 2015	July 11, 2015
873	867	24	"Scary Hospitality!" (The Scary House's Welcoming Services!); Transliteration: "Kowaiie no Omotenashi!" (Japanese: こわいイエのおもてなし！)	May 14, 2015	July 18, 2015
874	868	25	"A Fashionable Battle!" (Battle at the Fashion Show! Tatsubay VS Shushupu!!); Transliteration: "Fasshonshō de Batoru desu! Tatsubei VS Shushupu!!" (Japanese: ファッションショーでバトルです！タツベイVSシュシュプ！！)	May 21, 2015	July 25, 2015
875	869	26	"Fairy-Type Trickery!" (Kunoe Gym Battle! The Beautiful Fairy Trap!!); Transliteration: "Kunoe Jimu Sen! Utsukushiki Fearī no Wana! !" (Japanese: クノエジム戦！美しきフェアリーの罠！！)	May 28, 2015	August 1, 2015
876	870	27	"Rivals: Today and Tomorrow!" (Three-Match Rival Battle! Towards the Future!!); Transliteration: "Raibaru Batoru San hon Shōbu! Ashita ni Mukatte!!" (Japanese: ライバルバトル3本勝負！ 明日に向かって！！)	June 4, 2015	August 8, 2015
877	871	28	"A Not-So-Flying Start!" (The Wind, the Egg and Onbat!); Transliteration: "Kaze to Tamago to Onbatto!" (Japanese: 風とタマゴとオンバット！)	June 11, 2015	August 22, 2015
878	872	29	"A Relay in the Sky!" (The Pokémon Sky Relay Challenge! Fly, Onbat!!); Transliteration: "Chōsen Pokemon Sukai Rirē! Tobe, Onbatto!!" (Japanese: 挑戦ポケモンスカイリレー！飛べ、オンバット！！)	June 18, 2015	August 29, 2015
879	884	30	"Lights! Camera! Pika!" (Pikachu Becomes a Star!? Its Movie Debut!!) (How to Pikachu The Movie! OK! Action!!) The Lightning-fast Hero! Super Pikachu!! Transliteration: "Pikachu no dokidoki NG taishō" (Japanese: ピカチュウはスター！？映画デビュー！! How to ピカチュウ・ザ・ムービー！よーい！アクション！！ 迅雷のヒーロー！スーパーピカチュウ！！)	June 18, 2015	November 21, 2015
880	873	31	"A Frenzied Factory Fiasco!" (Fierce Battle in the Monster Ball Factory! Pikachu VS Nyarth!!); Transliteration: "Gekitō Monsutā Bōru Kōjō! Pikachuu VS Nyāsu!!" (Japanese: 激闘モンスターボール工場！ピカチュウVSニャース！！)	June 25, 2015	September 5, 2015
881	874	32	"Performing with Fiery Charm!" (Tairenar and Yancham!! A Captivating Fiery Performance!!); Transliteration: "Tērunā to Yanchamu!! Misero Honoo no Pafōmansu!!" (Japanese: テールナーとヤンチャム！！魅せろ炎のパフォーマンス！！)	July 2, 2015	September 12, 2015
882	875	33	"Rotom's Wish!" (Satoshi Leaps Through Time! Rotom's Wish!!); Transliteration: "Toki o Kakeru Satoshi! Rotomu no Negai!!" (Japanese: 時をかけるサトシ！ロトムの願い！！)	July 9, 2015	September 19, 2015
883	876	34	"A Festival Trade! A Festival Farewell?" (The Pumpjin Festival! Farewell, Bakeccha!?); Transliteration: "Panpujin Fesutibaru! Sayonara Bakeccha!?" (Japanese: パンプジンフェスティバル！さよならバケッチャ！?)	July 23, 2015	September 26, 2015
884	877	35	"Over the Mountain of Snow!" (Crossing the Snow Mountains! Mammoo and Yukinooh!!); Transliteration: "Yukiyama o Koete! Manmū to Yukino ō!!" (Japanese: 雪山をこえて！マンムーとユキノオー！！)	July 30, 2015	October 3, 2015
885	878	36	"Adventures in Running Errands!" (Harimaron! Its First Errand!!); Transliteration: "Harimaron! Hajimete no o Tsukai!!" (Japanese: ハリマロン ！はじめてのつかい！！)	August 13, 2015	October 10, 2015
886	879	37	"Mending a Broken Spirit!" (A Broken Twig and a Broken Heart! Tairenar's Strong Feelings!!); Transliteration: "Ore ta sae Ore ta Kokoro! Tērunā no Tsuyoki Omoi!!" (Japanese: 折れた小枝、折れた心！テールナーの強い思い！！)	August 20, 2015	October 17, 2015
887	880	38	"A Legendary Photo Op!" (Photo Op on Fire! Snap the Legend!!); Transliteration: "Shattā Chansu wa Faiyā! Densetsu o Tore!!" (Japanese: シャッターチャンスはファイヤー ！伝説を撮れ！！)	August 27, 2015	October 24, 2015
888	881	39	"The Tiny Caretaker!" (Eureka the Caretaker! The Spoiled Chigoras!!); Transliteration: "Yurīka Osewa desu! Amaenbō no Chigorasu!!" (Japanese: ユリーカお世話です！甘えん坊のチゴラス！！)	September 10, 2015	October 31, 2015
889	882	40	"A Trip Down Memory Train!" (Memories of the Train! Citron and Horubee!!); Transliteration: "Tsuioku no Torein! Shitoron to Horubī!!" (Japanese: 追憶のトレイン！シトロンとホルビー！！)	September 17, 2015	November 7, 2015
890	883	41	"A Frolicking Find in the Flowers!" (The Eievui Who is Shy of Strangers!? Capture at the Flower Garden!!); Transliteration: "ībui wa Hito Mishiri!? Ohanabatake de Tsukamae te!!" (Japanese: イーブイはひとみしり！？お花畑でつかまえて！！)	September 24, 2015	November 14, 2015
891	885	42	"Tag Team Battle Inspiration!" (A Tag Battle is a Friendship Battle! Eievui's First Time in a Fight!!); Transliteration: "Taggu batoru wa Yūjō Batoru! ībui Hatsu Sansen!!" (Japanese: タッグバトルは友情バトル！イーブイ初参戦！！)	October 1, 2015	November 28, 2015
892	886	43	"A Performance Pop Quiz!" (The Happy Dance Comes After the Quiz!? The Hyakkoku TriPokalon Tournament!!); Transliteration: "Happī Dansu wa Kuizu no Ato de!? Toraipokaron Hyakkoku Taikai!!" (Japanese: ハッピーダンスはクイズのあとで！？トライポカロン・ヒャッコク大会！！)	October 8, 2015	December 5, 2015
893	887	44	"Cloudy Fate, Bright Future!" (The Crisis in Kalos! The Battle of the Giant Sundial!!); Transliteration: "Karosu no Kiki! Kyodai Hidokei no Tatakai!!" (Japanese: カロスの危機！巨大日時計の戦い！！)	October 15, 2015	December 12, 2015
894	888	45	"All Eyes on the Future!" (The Double Battle in the Hyakkoku Gym! Gojika's Future Sight!!); Transliteration: "Hyakkokujimu no Daburu Batoru! Gojika no Mirai Yochi!!" (Japanese: ヒャッコクジムのダブルバトル！ゴジカの未来予知!!)	October 22, 2015	December 19, 2015

Jap. overall	Eng. overall	No. in season	English title Japanese title	Original release date	English air date
SP–6	SP–2	SP–1	"Pokémon: Mega Evolution Special II" (The Strongest Mega Evolution: Act II); Transliteration: "Saikyō Mega Shinka ~Act II~" (Japanese: 最強メガシンカ～Act II～)	November 6, 2014	February 7, 2015
SP–7	SP–3	SP–2	"Pokémon: Mega Evolution Special III" (The Strongest Mega Evolution: Act III); Transliteration: "Saikyō Mega Shinka ~Act III~" (Japanese: 最強メガシンカ～Act III～)	March 19, 2015	August 15, 2015
—	—	—	"Hoopa, The Mischief Pokémon" (The Minidjinni of the Word "Appear!": Hoopa); Transliteration: "O Demashi ko Majin Fūpa" (Japanese: おでまし小魔神フーパ)	June 19, 2015	December 3, 2015
SP–8	SP–4	SP–3	"Pokémon: Mega Evolution Special IV" (The Strongest Mega Evolution: Act IV); Transliteration: "Saikyō Mega Shinka ~Act IV~" (Japanese: 最強メガシンカ～Act IV～)	October 29, 2015	December 26, 2015

=== Season 19: XYZ (2015–16) ===
Jap. overall	Eng. overall	No. in season	English title Japanese title	Original release date	English air date
895	889	1	"From A to Z!" (Z's Explosive Birth! What Lurks in Kalos!!); Transliteration: "Z Bakutan! Karosu ni Hisomu Mono!!" (Japanese: Z爆誕！カロスに潜む者！！)	October 29, 2015	February 20, 2016
896	890	2	"Love Strikes! Eevee, Yikes!" (The Hot-blooded Hariborg! Puni-chan is Being Targeted!!); Transliteration: "Nekketsu Haribōgu! Nerawareta Puni-chan!!" (Japanese: 熱血ハリボーグ！狙われたプニちゃん！！)	November 5, 2015	February 27, 2016
897	891	3	"A Giga Battle With Mega Results!" (Mega Tabunne VS Giga Giga Nyarth!!); Transliteration: "Mega Tabunne VS Giga Giga Nyāsu!!" (Japanese: メガタブンネVSギガギガニャース！！)	November 12, 2015	March 5, 2016
898	892	4	"A Fiery Rite of Passage!" (Shishiko and Kaenjishi! A Fiery Departure!!); Transliteration: "Shishiko to Kaenjishi! Honō no tabidachi!!" (Japanese: シシコとカエンジシ！炎の旅立ち！！)	November 19, 2015	March 12, 2016
899	893	5	"Dream a Little Dream from Me!" (Pikachu, the Dreams Seen of Puni-chan!); Transliteration: "Pikachu, Puni-chan no yume o miru!" (Japanese: ピカチュウ、プニちゃんの夢を見る！)	November 26, 2015	March 19, 2016
900	894	6	"The Legend of the Ninja Hero!" (Welcome to the Ninja Village! The Legend of the Heroic Gekkouga!!); Transliteration: "Yōkoso ninja-mura e! Eiyū Gekkouga no densetsu!!" (Japanese: ようこそ忍者村へ！英雄ゲッコウガの伝説！！)	December 3, 2015	March 26, 2016
901	895	7	"A Festival of Decisions!" (Decisive Battle in the Ninja Village! Gekogashira VS Kirikizan!!); Transliteration: "Ninja-mura kessen! Gekogashira tai Kirikizan!!" (Japanese: 忍者村決戦！ゲコガシラ対キリキザン！！)	December 10, 2015	April 2, 2016
902	896	8	"A Dancing Debut!" (Dance, Eievui! Its TryPokaron Debut!!); Transliteration: "Odore Ībui! ToraiPokaron Debyū!!" (Japanese: 踊れイーブイ！トライポカロン･デビュー！！)	December 17, 2015	April 9, 2016
903	897	9	"Meeting at Terminus Cave!" (Terminus Cave! The Mystery of Z is Set in Motion!!); Transliteration: "Tsui no Dōkutsu! Ugokidashita Z no Nazo!!" (Japanese: ついの洞窟！動き出したZの謎！！)	December 24, 2015	April 16, 2016
904	898	10	"A Cellular Connection!" (Eureka and Puni-chan!); Transliteration: "Yurīka to Puni-chan!" (Japanese: ユリーカとプニちゃん！)	January 14, 2016	April 23, 2016
905	899	11	"A Windswept Encounter!" (Onbat and Flaette! An Encounter in the Wind!!); Transliteration: "Onbatto to Furaette! Kaze no naka no meguriai!!" (Japanese: オンバットとフラエッテ！風の中のめぐりあい！！)	January 21, 2016	April 30, 2016
906	900	12	"Party Dancecapades!" (Satoshi and Serena! Get One at the Dance Party!!); Transliteration: "Satoshi to Serena! Dansu pāti de getto da ze!!" (Japanese: サトシとセレナ！ダンスパーティでゲットだぜ！！)	January 28, 2016	May 7, 2016
907	901	13	"A Meeting of Two Journeys!" (The Strongest Mega Battle! Gekkouga VS Mega Lizardon!!); Transliteration: "Saikyō mega batoru! Gekkouga VS Mega Rizādon!!" (Japanese: 最強メガバトル！ゲッコウガVSメガリザードン！！)	February 4, 2016	May 14, 2016
908	902	14	"An Explosive Operation!" (The Explosive Ground Force! Operation: Capture Zygarde!!); Transliteration: "Bakuretsu Gurando Fōsu! Jigarude hokaku sakusen!!" (Japanese: 爆裂グランドフォース！ジガルデ捕獲作戦！！)	February 11, 2016	May 21, 2016
909	903	15	"A Watershed Moment!" (A Brigarron from the Wilderness! The Tree-Planting Robon!!); Transliteration: "Kōya no Burigaron! Ki wo ueru Robon!!" (Japanese: 荒野のブリガロン！木を植えるロボン！！)	February 18, 2016	May 28, 2016
910	904	16	"Master Class Choices!" (The Master Class Trial! What Will You Do, Serena!?); Transliteration: "Masutā Kurasu e no shiren! Dō suru Serena!?" (Japanese: マスタークラスへの試練！どうするセレナ！？)	February 25, 2016	June 4, 2016
911	905	17	"An Electrifying Rage!" (Thunder and Onvern! The Angry Lightning Strike!!); Transliteration: "Sandā to Onbān! Ikari no raigeki!!" (Japanese: サンダーとオンバーン！怒りの雷撃！！)	March 3, 2016	June 11, 2016
912	906	18	"Unlocking Some Respect!" (Left and Right! The Swaying Heart of Kametete!!); Transliteration: "Refuto to Raito! Yureru kokoro no Kametete!!" (Japanese: レフトとライト！揺れる心のカメテテ！！)	March 10, 2016	June 18, 2016
913	907	19	"Master Class is in Session!" (The Master Class Begins! A Maiden's Fierce Fight Where Sparks Fly!!); Transliteration: "Masutā Kurasu kaimaku! Hibana chiru otome no gekitō!!" (Japanese: マスタークラス開幕！火花散る乙女の激闘！！)	March 17, 2016	June 25, 2016
914	908	20	"Performing a Pathway to the Future!" (Elle VS Serena! Open the Door to the Future!!); Transliteration: "Eru VS Serena! Ake mirai e no tobira!!" (Japanese: エルVSセレナ！開け未来への扉！！)	March 24, 2016	July 2, 2016
915	909	21	"A Keeper for Keeps?!" (A Bride for Citron!? Eureka's S'il-vous-plaît Panic!!); Transliteration: "Shitoron no hanayome!? Yurīka no Shiru-bu-pure panikku!!" (Japanese: シトロンの花嫁！？ユリーカのシルブプレパニック！！)	April 7, 2016	July 9, 2016
916	910	22	"Battling at Full Volume!" (Serena Becomes Satoshi! The Ultimate Pikachu Showdown!!); Transliteration: "Serena, Satoshi ni naru! Saikyō Pikachū taiketsu!!" (Japanese: セレナ、サトシになる！最強ピカチュウ対決！！)	April 14, 2016	July 16, 2016
917	911	23	"The Synchronicity Test!" (Satoshi and Alan! Gekkouga VS Mega Lizardon Once Again!!); Transliteration: "Satoshi to Aran! Gekkouga VS Mega Rizādon futatabi!!" (Japanese: サトシとアラン！ゲッコウガVSメガリザードンふたたび！！)	April 21, 2016	July 23, 2016
918	912	24	"Making Friends and Influencing Villains!" (The Forest's Curse and the White Bokurei!); Transliteration: "Mori no noroi to shiroi Bokurē!" (Japanese: 森の呪いと白いボクレー！)	April 28, 2016	July 30, 2016
919	913	25	"Championing a Research Battle!" (Satoshi VS Champion Carnet! VS Mega Sirnight!!); Transliteration: "Satoshi tai chanpion Karune! VS Mega Sānaito!!" (Japanese: サトシ対チャンピオン・カルネ！VSメガサーナイト！！)	May 5, 2016	August 6, 2016
920	914	26	"A Full Strength Battle Surprise!" (Rival Showdown! Satoshi VS Shōta!!); Transliteration: "Raibaru taiketsu! Satoshi VS Shōta!!" (Japanese: ライバル対決！サトシVSショータ！！)	May 12, 2016	August 13, 2016
921	915	27	"All Hail the Ice Battlefield!" (Eisetsu Gym Battle! Battlefield of Ice!!); Transliteration: "Eisetsu Jimu Sen! Kōri no batorufīrudo!!" (Japanese: エイセツジム戦！氷のバトルフィールド！！)	May 19, 2016	August 20, 2016
922	916	28	"Seeing the Forest For the Trees!" (The Winding Woods...The Dawn of Evolution!!); Transliteration: "Mayoi no Mori...Shinka no Yoake!!" (Japanese: 迷いの森・・・進化の夜明け！)	May 26, 2016	August 27, 2016
923	917	29	"A Real Icebreaker!" (Satoshi-Gekkouga VS Mega Yukinooh! The Giant Water Shuriken Triggers!!); Transliteration: "Satoshi-Gekkouga VS Mega Yukinō'o!! Hatsudō kyodai mizu shuriken!!" (Japanese: サトシゲッコウガVSメガユキノオー！発動巨大水手裏剣！！)	June 2, 2016	September 3, 2016
924	918	30	"A Diamond in the Rough!" (Find Melecie! Numelgon and Dedenne!!); Transliteration: "Find Melecie! Numelgon and Dedenne!!" (Japanese: メレシーを探せ！ヌメルゴンとデデンネ！！)	June 9, 2016	September 10, 2016
925	919	31	"A Gaggle of Gadget Greatness!" (The Explosive Heat at the Mechanical Festival!!); Transliteration: "The Explosive Heat at the Mechanical Festival!!" (Japanese: 爆熱の機巧（からくり）フェスティバル！！)	June 16, 2016	September 17, 2016
926	920	32	"A League of His Own!" (The Kalos League Begins! The Mega Lizardon Showdown: X VS Y!!); Transliteration: "The Kalos League Begins! The Mega Lizardon Showdown: X VS Y!!" (Japanese: カロスリーグ開幕！メガリザードン対決・X対Y！！)	June 30, 2016	September 24, 2016
927	921	33	"Valuable Experience for All!" (Mega Jukain VS Raichu! Received Some Experience Points!!); Transliteration: "Mega Jukain VS Raichu! Received Some Experience Points!!" (Japanese: メガジュカイン対ライチュウ！経験値いただきます！！)	July 7, 2016	October 1, 2016
928	922	34	"Analysis Versus Passion!" (The Semifinal Full Battle! Satoshi Vs Shota!!); Transliteration: "The Semifinal Full Battle! Satoshi VS Shota!!" (Japanese: 準決勝フルバトル！サトシ対ショータ！！)	July 21, 2016	October 8, 2016
929	923	35	"A Riveting Rivalry!" (Decisive Rival Battle! Satoshi-Gekkouga Vs Mega Jukain!!); Transliteration: "Decisive Rival Battle! Satoshi-Gekkouga VS Mega Jukain!!" (Japanese: ライバル決戦！サトシゲッコウガVSメガジュカイン！！)	July 28, 2016	October 15, 2016
930	924	36	"Kalos League Passion with a Certain Flare!" (Fierce Fighting at the Kalos League! Gather, All of My Passion!!); Transliteration: "Fierce Fighting at the Kalos League! Gather, All of My Passion!!" (Japanese: 激闘カロスリーグ！集え、すべての熱き想いよ！！)	August 4, 2016	October 22, 2016
931	925	37	"Finals Not for the Faint-Hearted!" (Kalos League Finale! Satoshi vs Alan!!); Transliteration: "Kalos League Finale! Satoshi vs Alan!!" (Japanese: 決勝戦！サトシ対アラン！！)	August 11, 2016	October 29, 2016
932	926	38	"Down to the Fiery Finish!" (Kalos League Victory! Satoshi's Greatest Decisive Battle!!); Transliteration: "Kalos League Victory! Satoshi's Greatest Decisive Battle!!" (Japanese: カロスリーグ優勝！サトシ頂上決戦！！)	August 18, 2016	November 5, 2016
933	927	39	"A Towering Takeover!" (Flare Gang Attack! The Zygarde at the Prism Tower!!); Transliteration: "Shōgeki Furea-dan! Purizumu tawā no Jigarude!!" (Japanese: 襲撃フレア団！プリズムタワーのジガルデ！！)	August 25, 2016	November 12, 2016
934	928	40	"Coming Apart at the Dreams!" (The Shocking Zygarde VS Zygarde! The Collapsing World!!); Transliteration: "Shōgeki Jigarude tai Jigarude! Kowareyuku sekai!!" (Japanese: 衝撃ジガルデ対ジガルデ！壊れゆく世界！！)	September 1, 2016	November 19, 2016
935	929	41	"The Right Hero for the Right Job!" (Attack on Miare Gym! Citroid Forever!!); Transliteration: "Totsugeki Miare Jimu! Shitoroido yo ēen ni!!" (Japanese: 突撃ミアレジム！シトロイドよ永遠に！！)	September 8, 2016	December 3, 2016
936	930	42	"Rocking Kalos Defenses!" (The Megalith Moves Forward! The Kalos Line of Defense!!); Transliteration: "Shingeki-suru kyoseki! Karosu bōēsen!!" (Japanese: 進撃する巨石！カロス防衛線！！)	September 15, 2016	December 10, 2016
937	931	43	"Forming a More Perfect Union!" (The Zygarde Counterattack! The Final Decisive Battle of Kalos!!); Transliteration: "Hangeki no Jigarude! Karosu saishō kessen!!" (Japanese: 反撃のジガルデ！カロス最終決戦！！)	September 15, 2016	December 17, 2016
938	932	44	"Battling With a Clean Slate!" (Starting from Zero! Citron's Decision!!); Transliteration: "Hajimari wa Zero! Shitoroido no Ketsudan!!" (Japanese: はじまりはゼロ！シトロンの決断！！)	October 6, 2016	December 24, 2016
939	933	45	"The First Day of the Rest of Your Life!" (One Last Battle with Satoshi! Serena's Choice!!); Transliteration: "Satoshi to Rasuto Batoru! Serena no Sentaku!!" (Japanese: サトシとラストバトル！セレナの選択！！)	October 13, 2016	January 7, 2017
940	934	46	"Facing the Needs of the Many!" (Farewell, Satoshi Gekkouga! Xerosicy Strikes Back); Transliteration: "Saraba Satoshi Gekkouga! Xerosicy no gyakushū" (Japanese: さらばサトシゲッコウガ！クセロシキの逆襲)	October 20, 2016	January 14, 2017
941	935	47	"Till We Compete Again!" (A Zero With No End! Till the Day We Meet Again!!); Transliteration: "Owari naki zero! Mata au hi made!!" (Japanese: 終わりなきゼロ！ また逢う日まで！！)	October 27, 2016	January 21, 2017

Jap. overall	Eng. overall	No. in season	English title Japanese title	Original release date	English air date
SP–9	SP–5	SP–1	"The Legend of X, Y, and Z!" (XYZ's Legend!); Transliteration: "XYZ no densetsu!" (Japanese: XYZの伝説！)	November 3, 2016	January 28, 2017
SP–10	—	SP–2	"The Strongest Duo! Citron and Cilan!!"; Transliteration: "Saikyō no futari! Citron to Dent!!" (Japanese: 最強の二人！シトロンとデント！！)	November 10, 2016	—

== Home media releases ==
=== DVD ===
Box Sets (USA, Region 1) [VIZ Media]
Volume			Episodes	Release date	Ref.
Season 10: Diamond and Pearl (2006–07)	Box Sets	Box Set 1: Episodes 1–17	469–485	September 16, 2008	
Season 10: Diamond and Pearl (2006–07)	Box Sets	Box Set 2: Episodes 18–34	486–502	November 4, 2008	
Season 10: Diamond and Pearl (2006–07)	Box Sets	Box Set 3: Episodes 35–51	503–515, 517–520	March 17, 2009	
Season 10: Diamond and Pearl (2006–07)	The Complete Season		469–515, 517–520	August 20, 2019	
Season 11: Diamond and Pearl: Battle Dimension (2007–08)	Box Sets	Box Set 1: Episodes 1–17	521–537	June 23, 2009	
Season 11: Diamond and Pearl: Battle Dimension (2007–08)	Box Sets	Box Set 2: Episodes 18–34	538, 541–556	August 25, 2009	
Season 11: Diamond and Pearl: Battle Dimension (2007–08)	Box Sets	Box Set 3: Episodes 35–52	539–540, 557–572	October 27, 2009	
Season 11: Diamond and Pearl: Battle Dimension (2007–08)	The Complete Season		521–572	January 7, 2020	
Season 12: Diamond and Pearl: Galactic Battles (2008–09)	Box Sets	Box Set 1: Episodes 1–15	573–587	March 15, 2011	
Season 12: Diamond and Pearl: Galactic Battles (2008–09)	Box Sets	Box Set 2: Episodes 16–27	589–600	May 10, 2011	
Season 12: Diamond and Pearl: Galactic Battles (2008–09)	Box Sets	Box Set 3: Episodes 28–39	601–612	August 30, 2011	
Season 12: Diamond and Pearl: Galactic Battles (2008–09)	Box Sets	Box Set 4: Episodes 40–52	613–625	November 22, 2011	
Season 12: Diamond and Pearl: Galactic Battles (2008–09)	The Complete Season		573–587, 589–625	August 18, 2020	
Season 13: Diamond and Pearl: Sinnoh League Victors (2010)	Box Sets	Set 1: Episodes 1–11	626–635, 637	February 28, 2012	
Season 13: Diamond and Pearl: Sinnoh League Victors (2010)	Box Sets	Set 2: Episodes 12–22	636, 638–647	May 1, 2012	
Season 13: Diamond and Pearl: Sinnoh League Victors (2010)	Box Sets	Set 3: Episodes 23–34	648–659	September 4, 2012	
Season 13: Diamond and Pearl: Sinnoh League Victors (2010)	The Complete Season		626–659	February 23, 2021	
Season 14: Black & White (2010–11)	Box Sets	Set 1	660–671	November 20, 2012	
Season 14: Black & White (2010–11)	Box Sets	Set 2	672–683	January 22, 2013	
Season 14: Black & White (2010–11)	Box Sets	Set 3	684–695	March 19, 2013	
Season 14: Black & White (2010–11)	Box Sets	Set 4	696–707	May 14, 2013	
Season 14: Black & White (2010–11)	The Complete Season		660–707	July 27, 2021	
Season 15: Black & White: Rival Destinies (2011–12)	Box Sets	Set 1	708–719	September 10, 2013	
Season 15: Black & White: Rival Destinies (2011–12)	Box Sets	Set 2	720–731	December 3, 2013	
Season 15: Black & White: Rival Destinies (2011–12)	Box Sets	Set 3	732–756	March 18, 2014	
Season 15: Black & White: Rival Destinies (2011–12)	The Complete Season		708–756	March 15, 2022	
Season 16: Black & White: Adventures in Unova and Beyond (2012–13)	Box Sets	Set 1	757–781	September 23, 2014	
Season 16: Black & White: Adventures in Unova and Beyond (2012–13)	Box Sets	Set 2	782–801	March 24, 2015	
Season 16: Black & White: Adventures in Unova and Beyond (2012–13)	The Complete Season		757–801	February 21, 2023	
Season 17: XY (2013–14)	Box Sets	Set 1	802–825	August 4, 2015	
Season 17: XY (2013–14)	Box Sets	Set 2	826–849	January 19, 2016	
Season 17: XY (2013–14)	The Complete Season		802–849	June 11, 2024	
Season 18: XY: Kalos Quest (2014–15)	Box Sets	Set 1	850–871	July 12, 2016	
Season 18: XY: Kalos Quest (2014–15)	Box Sets	Set 2	872–894	December 13, 2016	
Season 18: XY: Kalos Quest (2014–15)	The Complete Season		850–894	September 24, 2024	
Season 19: XYZ (2015–16)	Box Sets	Set 1	895–918	August 29, 2017	
Season 19: XYZ (2015–16)	Box Sets	Set 2	919–941, SP–9	February 6, 2018	
Season 19: XYZ (2015–16)	The Complete Season		895–941, SP–9	February 11, 2025	
