= Hidenori =

- Gender: Male

Origin
- Origin: Japanese
- Meaning: Different meanings depending on the kanji used

Hidenori (written: 秀典, 秀憲, 秀則, 秀徳, 英則, 英徳 or 英智) is a masculine Japanese given name. Notable people with the name include:

- Hidenori Arai (新井 秀徳), Japanese sound effects editor
- Hidenori Hara (原 秀則; born 1961), Japanese manga artist
- Hidenori Inatsu (稲津 秀則; born 1938), Japanese ice hockey player
- Hidenori Isa (井佐 英徳; born 1976), Japanese biathlete
- Hidenori Ishii (石井 秀典; born 1985), Japanese footballer
- Hidenori Iwasaki (岩崎 英則; born 1975), Japanese video game composer
- Hidenori Kato (加藤 秀典; born 1981), Japanese footballer
- Hidenori Kuramoto (蔵本 英智; born 1976), Japanese baseball player
- Hidenori Kusaka (日下 秀憲), Japanese manga artist
- Hidenori Mago (真子 秀徳; born 1982), Japanese footballer
- Hidenori Nodera (野寺 秀徳; born 1975), Japanese cyclist
- Hidenori Shoji (庄司 英徳), Japanese video game composer
- Hidenori Takahashi (英則 高橋; born 1983), Japanese footballer
- Hidenori Tanoue (田上 秀則; born 1980), Japanese baseball player
- Hidenori Tokuyama (徳山 秀典; born 1982), Japanese actor and singer
