= Pokémon: Black and White =

Pokémon: Black and White may refer to:

- Pokémon Black and White, two 2010 video games
- Pokémon Black and White (manga), a 2011–2015 manga series
- Pokémon the Series: Black & White, the fourteenth season of the Pokémon anime series and the first of a rebooted series, originally airing 2010–2011
