= Kuramoto =

Kuramoto may refer to:

- Kuramoto (surname)
- Kuramoto Station (Tokushima)
- Kuramoto Station (Nagano)
- Kuramoto model
- Kuramoto, Director of the Striders.
