= List of Pokémon Adventures volumes (1–20) =

Pokémon Adventures, known in Japan as Pocket Monsters Special (ポケットモンスター SPECIAL, Poketto Monsutā SPECIAL), is a Japanese manga series published by Shogakukan. The story arcs of the series are based on most of the Pokémon video games released by Nintendo and, as such, the main characters of the series have the name of their video game. Since the manga is based on the video games, there are some delays with the serialization since the authors need to have seen the games in order to continue with the plot.

The series is written by Hidenori Kusaka. It is illustrated by Mato during the first nine volumes, while Satoshi Yamamoto has illustrated it since the tenth volume. The Japanese publisher Shogakukan has been releasing the individual chapters in tankōbon format with the first one being released on August 8, 1997, and currently, 64 tankōbon have been released.

The distributing company Viz Media has licensed the series for English in the United States. Viz released the first seven volumes of the series in tankōbon format from July 6, 2000 to January 2003 as well as in magazine format. During 2006 they released two volumes with the name of The Best of Pokémon Adventures which are various chapters from the first two arcs put into one book. On June 1, 2009, Viz restarted publishing the tankōbon volumes, and are now up to volume 9 as of October 2010. Volume 10 is scheduled for December 2010, and volumes 11, 12 and volume 30 of the DP arc (known as volume 1 of Platinum in Viz's release) are all scheduled for 2011 as well. However, these releases feature both visual and dialogue edits not found in the original English release and original Japanese tankobon release.

== Volume list ==
=== Volumes 1–20 ===
==== Red, Green & Blue ====
No.	Title	Original release date	English release date
1	Desperado Pikachu	August 8, 1997; 4-09-149331-9	July 6, 2000; 978-1-56931-507-1
001. "A Glimpse of the Glow" (VSミュウ, VS Myū; "VS Mew"); 002. "Bulbasaur Come Home!" (VS フシギダネ, VS Fushigidane; "VS Fushigidane"); 003. "The Secret of Kangaskhan" (VSガルーラ, VS Garūra; "VS Garura"); 004. "Wanted Pikachu!" (VSピカチュウ, VS Pikachū; "VS Pikachu"); 005. "Onix Is On!" (VSイワーク, VS Iwāku; "VS Iwark"); 006. "Gyarados Splashes In!" (VSギャラドス, VS Gyaradosu; "VS Gyarados"); 007. "Raging Rhydon" (VSサイドン, VS Saidon; "VS Sidon"); 008. "Suddenly Starmie" (VSスターミー, VS Sutāmī; "VS Starmie"); 009. "...But Fearow Itself!" (VSオニドリル, VS Onidoriru; "VS Onidrill"); 010. "Danger: High Voltorb" (VSビリリダマ; "VS Biriridama"); 011. "Buzz Off, Electabuzz!" (VSエレブー, VS Erebū; "VS Eleboo"); 012. "Wake Up—You're Snorlax!" (VSカビゴン; "VS Kabigon"); 013. "Sigh for Psyduck" (VSコダック, VS Kodakku; "VS Koduck"); 014. "That Awful Arbok!" (VSアーボック, VS Ābokku; "VS Arbok")
Red, a young ambitious Pokémon trainer loses to the phantom Pokémon Mew and decides then and there to become the best Pokémon trainer in the world. He approaches Prof. Oak, who gives him a Bulbasaur, a Grass-type Pokémon, after evaluating Red's skills. He also gives Red a Pokédex, which is the encyclopedia of Pokémon, to register data in it during his travels. Red finds that Oak has a grandson named Blue who will be his rival. Red continues on with his Pokémon to Pewter City to acquire the Boulder Badge from Gym Leader Brock. After arriving in Pewter City, Red captures a Pikachu who is troubling local residents and tries to train it. Red later defeats Brock and his Rock-type Pokémon and acquires the Boulder Badge, but finds that Blue has also won it. Next, he finds a young girl named Misty fighting a Gyarados and helps her out by capturing it, only for her to tell him that it was her Gyarados earlier and that it has drastically changed. Misty takes Red to Mt. Moon, where they search for Team Rocket grunts who are experimenting on Pokémon for evil purposes. Together, they defeat Team Rocket admin Koga and fellow Grunts and acquire the Moon Stone, which has the ability to boost a certain Pokémon's power. At Cerulean City, Misty reveals to Red that she is the Gym Leader there and battles him with her Water-type Pokémon. Red beats Misty and then heads towards Vermilion City, where he finds out that Lt. Surge is illegally trading Pokémon and is trying to forcefully evolve them. Red fights Lt. Surge's entire gang (which involve Electric-type Pokémon) and rescues the Pokémon on his ship. The Pokémon Fan Club in Vermilion City thank Red for his efforts. Along the way Red also gains access the Pokémon Storage System by helping its creator, Bill. Later, Red participates in a bicycle race with a grand prize and is interrupted by a sleeping Snorlax who is obstructing his path. Red, after much effort, captures Snorlax and wins the race. Red then travels to Lavender Town to find a haunted Pokémon tower. After getting briefed by the local Mr. Fuji, he finds Blue stuck there under the influence of a hypnotic Pokémon. Red fights an Arbok there and rescues Blue and also defeats the aforementioned hypnotic Pokémon trainer Koga, who is considered to be Team Rocket's most elite member. In the end, Red and Blue part ways, as their adventure is only just beginning.
2	Legendary Pokémon	December 16, 1997; 4-09-149332-7	December 6, 2000; 978-1-56931-508-8
015. "Wartortle Wars" (VSカメール, VS Kamēru; "VS Kameil"); 016. "Tauros the Tyrant" (VSケンタロス, VS Kentarosu; "VS Kentauros"); 017. "The Jynx Jinx" (VSルージュラ, VS Rūjura; "VS Rougela"); 018. "A Tale of Ninetales" (VSキュウコン, VS Kyūkon; "VS Kyukon"); 019. "Blame It on Eevee" (VSイーブイ, VS Ībui; "VS Eievui"); 020. "Meanvile...Vileplume!" (VSラフレシア, VS Rafureshia; "VS Rafflesia"); 021. "Long Live the Nidoking!" (VSニドキング, VS Nidokingu; "VS Nidoking"); 022. "A Hollow Victreebel" (VSウツボット, VS Utsubotto; "VS Utsubot"); 023. "Make Way for Magmar!" (VSブーバー, VS Būbā; "VS Boober"); 024. "What a Dragonite" (VSカイリュー, VS Kairyū; "VS Kairyu"); 025. "You Know...Articuno!" (VSフリーザー, VS Furīzā; "VS Freezer"); 026. "Holy Moltres" (VSファイヤー, VS Faiyā; "VS Fire"); 027. "Kalling Kadabra" (VSユンゲラー, VS Yungerā; "VS Yungerer")
A young girl named Green deceives Red by giving him fake Pokémon items. Red finds her and stumbles upon Team Rocket's lab, where they find Mewtwo, a powerful evil Pokémon artificially being created from Mew. Red later receives a call from Prof. Oak telling him his Squirtile has been stolen from his lab. Red fights the Team Rocket Grunts as they escape against a Tauros. Red later goes to Celadon City and finds the Gym Leader Erika, who is wanting an Eevee. Red captures an Eevee and notices that it can evolve into all of its three elemental stages simultaneously, also while coming to the understanding that Erika wants to manipulate Pokémon evolution. Red eventually defeats her to win the Rainbow Badge. Meanwhile, Team Rocket catches all of the three legendary bird Pokémon, Moltres (the Fire-type), Zapdos (the Electric-type), and Articuno (the Ice-type). Red goes into Safari Zone, and after an accident, he somehow captures a Nidoking, Victreebel and other Pokémon with special Safari Pokéballs. Red meets a stranger named Giovanni, who turns out to be the leader of Team Rocket, and fights a Magmar, which is purposely released free from the Safari Zone by Giovanni. Red tries to acquire the hidden machine (HM) known as Surf from under the sea in order to travel across seas on his Pokémon, but is attacked by a Dragonite. Misty saves him and gives him a Gyarados to travel across seas. On Cinnabar Island, Red helps Blaine, the Cinnabar Gym Leader and the well-known ex-scientist of Team Rocket, escape by hatching an egg of Aerodactyl and defeating Team Rocket once again. After returning to Pallet town, Red finds a Kadabra, in the form of Prof. Oak who gives him the message that Team Rocket has Prof. Oak held hostage in Saffron City. Red and Blue come to the understanding that Saffron City is serving as Team Rocket's headquarters, and that the clash between them and Team Rocket is nearing.
3	Saffron City Siege	May 28, 1998; 4-09-149333-5	August 5, 2001; 978-1-56931-560-6
028. "Peace of Mime" (VSバリヤード, VS Bariyādo; "VS Barrierd"); 029. "Go for the Golbat" (VSゴルバット, VS Gorubatto; "VS Golbat"); 030. "Zap! Zap! Zapdos!" (VSサンダー, VS Sandā; "VS Thunder"); 031. "The Art of Articuno" (VSフリーザー, VS Furīzā; "VS Freezer"); 032. "A Little Kadabra'll Do It" (VSユンゲラー, VS Yungerā; "VS Yungerer"); 033. "The Winged Legends" (VS伝説の鳥ポケモン, VS Densetsu no Tori Pokémon; "VS Legendary Bird Pokémon"); 034. "And Mewtwo Too!?" (VSミュウツー(前編), VS Myūtsū (Zenpen); "VS Mewtwo (Part 1)"); 035. "And Mewtwo...Three!" (VSミュウツー(後編), VS Myūtsū (Kōhen); "VS Mewtwo (Part 2)"); 036. "Drat That Dratini!" (VSミニリュウ, VS Miniryū; "VS Miniryu"); 037. "Golly, Golem!" (VSゴローニャ, VS Gorōnya; "VS Golonya"); 038. "Long Live the Nidoqueen!?" (VSニドクイン, VS Nidokuin; "VS Nidoqueen"); 039. "Just a Spearow Carrier" (VSオニスズメ; "VS Onisuzume"); 040. "A Charizard...and a Champion" (VSリザードン, VS Rizādon; "VS Lizardon")
Red and Blue go to Saffron City where Team Rocket's hideout, Silph Co., is located. Blue encounters a psychic barrier set up by Team Rocket using a Mr. Mime, and he sends his Golduck along with Red's Pikachu and defeats Mr. Mime in order to infiltrate Team Rocket's headquarters. They battle some Grunts, and Blue then finds his grandfather Prof. Oak in a basement. Red fights Lt. Surge, who now has a lot of Voltorbs with never-ending energy which is harnessed by Zapdos, the legendary Electric-type Pokémon. Red electrocutes him after exposing his body to air. Meanwhile, Green takes on Sabrina, a psychic Pokémon trainer with great abilities. Green fights off her Alakazam, and runs away after stealing her badge. Prof. Oak and the townsmen are rescued, but Blue is challenged by Koga and his Ghost-type Pokémon, but Blue easily defeats him. Red, Blue and Green activate the seven badges and accidentally awaken the three legendary Pokémon, who have merged, as The Gym Leaders join forces with Red in order to stop the legendary Pokémon. The legendary Pokémon are defeated by Red's Venusaur, Blue's Charizard and Green's Blastoise. Later, Red rescues a young trainer named Yellow, a girl disguised as a boy, and teaches her how to catch a Pokémon. Red heads towards the Viridian City Gym, and is challenged by Giovanni, who turns out to be the legendary missing Gym Leader for that city. After a great effort, Red defeats Giovanni using Pikachu's Thundershock. Shortly after, Blue and Red meet at the Indigo Plateau for the championship tournament. Prof. Oak, disguised as the mysterious "Dr. O" for the tournament, defeats Green and teaches her a valuable lesson regarding her traumatic past. Red and Blue eventually face off against each other in the tournament's final battle, and Red defeats Blue following multiple planned attacks with his Poliwrath, Pikachu and Venusaur.

==== Yellow chapter ====
No.	Title	Original release date	English release date
4	The Yellow Caballero: A Trainer in Yellow	December 16, 1998; 4-09-149334-3	January 9, 2002; 978-1-56931-710-5
041. "Ponyta Tale" (VSポニータ, VS Ponīta; "VS Ponyta"); 042. "Do Do That Doduo" (VSドードー, VS Dōdō; "VS Dodo"); 043. "Sea Sea Seadra" (VSシードラ, VS Shīdora; "VS Seadra"); 044. "Do Wrong, Dewgong!" (VSジュゴン; "VS Jugon"); 045. "Cloystered" (VSパルシェン, VS Parushen; "VS Parshen"); 046. "Whacked by Marowak!" (VSガラガラ; "VS Garagara"); 047. "Purrrr-sian" (VSペルシアン, VS Perushian; "VS Persian"); 048. "Paras Sight" (VSパラス, VS Parasu; "VS Paras"); 049. "As Gastly as Before" (VSゴース, VS Gōsu; "VS Ghos"); 050. "Lapras Lazily" (VSラプラス, VS Rapurasu; "VS Laplace"); 051. "Electro Magneton" (VSレアコイル, VS Reakoiru; "VS Rarecoil"); 052. "Growing Out of Gengar" (VSゲンガー, VS Gengā; "VS Gangar")
Two years after his victory in the Pokémon League Championships, Red disappears after receiving a challenge letter from the Elite Four's Bruno, and his Pikachu, nicknamed Pika, returns badly wounded to Prof. Oak's laboratory. Pika is later recruited by Yellow, who uses her psychic powers to heal Pika, and starts to actively search for the missing Red. Prof. Oak gives Yellow a Pokédex to help her with searching for Red after testing her skills and understanding her emotional attachment with the Pokémon. While fishing a Seadra, Yellow meets a researcher named Bill when all of a sudden they are both chased and attacked by Elite Four member Lorelei and her Pokémon (Dewgong and Cloyster), who wants to steal Pika in order to eradicate any trace of Red. Yellow manages to run away from Lorelei with the help of Duduo, Rattata and Pikachu, escaping her ice wall. Prof. Oak sends a letter to Blue to join forces with the Gym Leaders to search for Red and to help Yellow in her training. Pika is later stolen by a trainer named Miles, who is working under the Elite Four's orders. Yellow and Erika battle Miles and his Pokémon (Persian, Marowak and Paras) in Celadon City and defeat him strategically. As they are about to get information about Red's whereabouts from Miles, another member of the Elite Four, Agatha, is referred to be the person possessing Miles's actions with one of her Ghost-type Pokémon. Erika suggests they contact Blaine for help finding Red. Blue, Brock and Misty reappear, and help Yellow and the Gym Leaders defeat Miles and retrieve Pika, as Blue takes Yellow away to train shortly thereafter. On the way, Blue reveals to Yellow the events that occurred right before last year's tournaments, such as how he declared to help a young boy get back his Haunter, which led to his encounter with Agatha at an abandoned power plant, all while realizing how powerful the Elite Four truly are. Elsewhere, Bruno is training hard with his Hitmonlee. Lance, the final member and leader of the Elite Four, urgently leaves for Vermilion City.
5	The Yellow Caballero: Making Waves	April 26, 1999; 4-09-149335-1	January 9, 2002; 978-1-56931-563-7
053. "Can't Catch Caterpie?" (VSキャタピー, VS Kyatapī; "VS Caterpie"); 054. "Pidgeotto Pick-Me-Up" (VSピジョン, VS Pijon; "VS Pigeon"); 055. "The Primeape Directive" (VSオコリザル; "VS Okorizaru"); 056. "The Coming of Slowpoke (Eventually)" (VSヤドン; "VS Yadon"); 057. "Ekans the Ecstasy" (VSアーボ, VS Ābo; "VS Arbo"); 058. "The Kindest Tentacruel" (VSドククラゲ; "VS Dokukurage"); 059. "Hitmonlee, Baby (One More Time)" (VSサワムラー, VS Sawamurā; "VS Sawamular"); 060. "Breath of Dragonair Part 1" (VSハクリュー(前編), VS Hakuryū (Zenpen); "VS Hakuryu (Part 1)"); 061. "Breath of Dragonair Part 2" (VSハクリュー(中編), VS Hakuryū (Chōhen); "VS Hakuryu (Part 2)"); 062. "Breath of Dragonair Part 3" (VSハクリュー(後編), VS Hakuryū (Kōhen); "VS Hakuryu (Part 3)"); 063. "Extricated from Exeggutor" (VSナッシー, VS Nasshī; "VS Nassy"); 064. "Putting It on the Line...Against Arcanine" (VSウインディ, VS Uindi; "VS Windie"); 065. "Karate Machop!" (VSワンリキー, VS Wanrikī; "VS Wanriky")
Blue demonstrates to Yellow how to train with Pokémon and how to use their abilities. Blue helps Yellow capture a Caterpie in her training. Later, Yellow thanks Blue for training her, but tells him that she has decided to travel alone in order to become stronger by herself. Blue informs Yellow that the best way to reach her destinations are via sea, and advises her to board the S.S. Anne ocean liner, since none of her Pokémon can swim. Brock arrives at Mt. Moon and starts to investigate, as he and Blaine deduce it to be the last place Red was seen before his disappearance. Yellow meets the chairman of the Pokémon Fan Club on the S.S. Anne, which is being infiltrated by the Team Rocket Elite Trio. After much confusion (courtesy of the battle), Yellow is able to defeat the Team Rocket Elite Trio with her team of Pokémon. While still in Vermilion City, Yellow learns of the legend of the Vermilion Harbor and wonders if Red is to blame for the bad things that are happening to the city. Yellow also helps out and makes a promise to a swimmer in need and enters a Surfing contest, with a Dragonair being the top prize. Yellow meets Lance, who easily controls the Dragonair and uses it to destroy half of Vermilion City, while revealing to Yellow the Elite Four's plan to eliminate all mankind except for them as a result of the pollution they have caused. Meanwhile, Green and Bill are in a lengthy battle with Bruno's Hitmonlee, who attacks them by surprise. After surviving a harsh battle with Lance, Yellow meets Gym Leaders Brock and Blaine, who have discovered an ice cocoon in the shape of Red. Shortly afterwards, the Elite Four's Pokémon armies start attacking all of Kanto's cities, leaving Yellow, Blue and Blaine as the only Trainers able to go to the Elite Four's secret hideout in Cerise Island, as the other Gym Leaders have gone back to protect their respective cities. Upon arriving on the island, they are met by Koga, Lt. Surge and Sabrina there.
6	The Yellow Caballero: The Cave Campaign	November 27, 1999; 4-09-149336-X	September 5, 2002; 978-1-59116-028-1
066. "Punching Poliwrath" (VSニョロボン, VS Nyorobon; "VS Nyorobon"); 067. "Can You Diglett?" (VSディグダ, VS Diguda; "VS Digda"); 068. "Jigglypuff Jive" (VSプリン; "VS Purin"); 069. "Playing Horsea" (VSタッツー, VS Tattsū; "VS Tattu"); 070. "Allied by Alakazam!" (VSフーディン, VS Fūdin; "VS Foodin"); 071. "Muk Raking" (VSベトベトン, VS Betobeton; "VS Betbeton"); 072. "Weezing Winks Out" (VSマタドガス, VS Matadogasu; "VS Matadogas"); 073. "Valiant Venomoth! (VSモルフォン, VS Morufon; "VS Morphon"); 074. "Make Way for Magikarp" (VSコイキング, VS Koikingu; "VS Koiking"); 075. "Electrode's Big Shock!" (VSマルマイン, VS Marumain; "VS Marumine"); 076. "Take a Chance on Chansey" (VSラッキー, VS Rakkī; "VS Lucky"); 077. "Striking Golduck" (VSゴルダック, VS Gorudakku; "VS Golduck"); 078. "Victim of Venusaur" (VSフシギバナ; "VS Fushigibana")
Bruno remembers his fight against Red, which was interrupted by Agatha and Lorelei who wanted Red to give them information about Giovanni's Earth Badge from Viridian City. Following Red's decision not to join them, the trio immobilize him and freeze his body, with Pika being ordered to escape. Later, Green and Bill go to Cerise Island, where they join the alliance of Team Rocket's Gym leaders, as well as meeting up with Yellow, Blue and Blaine in order to stop the Elite Four. Splitting in pairs to locate the four members, Blue and Koga find Agatha, while Green and Sabrina encounter Lorelei, and Lt. Surge and Bill fight Bruno. With the Elite Four members taking the upper hand, Red arrives to take Surge's and Bill's position in their battle.
7	The Yellow Caballero: The Pokémon Elite	April 26, 2000; 4-09-149336-X	January 2003; 978-1-4215-3060-4
079. "Airing Out Aerodactyl" (VSプテラ①, VS Putera ①; "VS Ptera ①"); 080. "Draggin' In Dragonair" (VSプテラ②, VS Putera ②; "VS Ptera ②"); 081. "Aerodactyl Redux" (VSプテラ③, VS Putera ③; "VS Ptera ③"); 082. "Eradicate Raticate!" (VSラッタ; "VS Ratta"); 083. "Bang the Drum, Slowbro" (VSヤドラン; "VS Yadoran"); 084. "Clefabulous Clefable" (VSピクシー, VS Pikushī; "VS Pixy"); 085. "Gimme Shellder" (VSシェルダー, VS Sherudā; "VS Shellder"); 086. "Double Dragonair" (VSハクリュー, VS Hakuryū; "VS Hakuryu"); 087. "Rhyhorn Rising" (VSサイホーン, VS Saihōn; "VS Sihorn"); 088. "The Beedrill All and End All" (VSスピアー, VS Supiā; "VS Spear"); 089. "The Might of...Metapod!?" (VSトランセル, VS Toranseru; "VS Trancell"); 090. "The Legend" (VS???; "VS ???")
Yellow and Blaine reach Lance, but Blaine faints when he is unable to keep using Mewtwo. Yellow continues fighting Lance alone, but is unable to defeat his Dragon-type Pokémon. During their fight, Yellow is revealed to be a girl from Viridian Forest, who Red once saved and following his disappearance, Green told her to go save him after seeing she possessed psychic powers. Its also established that Lance and Yellow have very similar backgrounds, and that Green had given Yellow a straw hat as a means to cover her identity. Meanwhile, Red, Blue, and Green defeat their respective opponents, leaving the Trainers to search for Yellow. Lance manages to steal the Earth Badge as a means to use the whole set of Gym Badges to unleash and control a Legendary Pokémon named Lugia, who will wipe out humanity with a single stroke of its wings and attacks. Yellow is assisted by Giovanni (who is known to be the one that helped free Red from his ice cocoon), and is able to turn Lugia's destructive power into healing power, rejuvenating the island. With Red, Blue and Green reunited once again, Yellow manages to defeat Lance, freeing the Legendary Pokémon and ending the Elite Four's menace. With the Elite Four saga concluded, the Pokédex holders assist the Gym Leaders in rebuilding Kanto.

==== Gold, Silver & Crystal chapter ====
No.	Title	Original release date	English release date
8	—	August 8, 2001; 4-09-149338-6	August 3, 2010; 978-1-4215-3061-1
091. "Murkrow Flies" (VSヤミカラス; "VS Yamikarasu"); 092. "Hoothoot Time" (VSホーホー, VS Hōhō; "VS Hoho"); 093. "Sneaky Sneasel" (VSニューラ, VS Nyūra; "VS Nyula"); 094. "Buzzing Elekid" (VSエレキッド, VS Erekiddo; "VS Elekid"); 095. "Fume! Stantler, Fume!" (VSオドシシ; "VS Odoshishi"); 096. "Who's the Leader, Donphan?" (VSドンファン; "VS Donfan"); 097. "Bellsprouts Formation" (VSマダツボミ; "VS Madatsubomi"); 098. "Totodile, Come with Me!" (VSワニノコ; "VS Waninoko"); 099. "Sunshine Sunkern" (VSヒマナッツ, VS Himanattsu; "VS Himanuts"); 100. "Fighting Symbols, Unown" (VSアンノーン, VS Annōn; "VS Unknown"); 101. "My Chubby Teddiursa" (VSヒメグマ; "VS Himeguma"); 102. "One Angry Ursaring" (VSリングマ; "VS Ringuma"); 103. "Houndour from the Dark" (VSデルビル, VS Derubiru; "VS Delvil")
Gold, a Trainer from the Johto Region, goes on an errand with a friend to meet Professor Oak, but on the way he meets a trainer named Silver, who steals Professor Elm's Totodile. Gold encounters him, but is sidetracked by another trainer. After Silver defeats them and escapes, Gold makes it his mission to stop Silver and receives a Pokédex from Professor Oak to analyze the Pokémon he finds on his travels. While investigating the Bellsprout Tower in Violet City, Gold manages to battle Silver again, but is unable to stop him. Nevertheless, Gold does not give up and continues his adventures, befriending the Johto Gym Leaders on the way and fighting more members from Team Rocket and their new leader, known as Mask of Ice.
9	—	August 8, 2001; 4-09-149339-4	October 5, 2010; 978-1-4215-3062-8
104. "The Ariados Up There" (VSアリアドス, VS Ariadosu; "VS Ariados"); 105. "Smeargle Smudge" (VSドーブル, VS Dōburu; "VS Doble"); 106. "How Do You Do, Sudowoodo?" (VSウソッキー, VS Usokkī; "VS Usokkie"); 107. "Gligar Guide" (VSグライガー, VS Guraigā; "VS Gliger"); 108. "Quilava Quandary" (VSマグマラシ, VS Magumarashi; "VS Magmarashi"); 109. "Ampharos Amore" (VSデンリュウ, VS Denryū; "VS Denryu"); 110. "Piloswine Whine" (VSイノムー, VS Inomū; "VS Inomoo"); 111. "Tyranitar War" (VSバンギラス, VS Bangirasu; "VS Bangiras"); 112. "Raise the Red Gyarados" (VS赤いギャラドス, VS Akai Gyaradosu); 113. "Delibird Delivery ①" (VSデリバード①, VS Deribādo ①); 114. "Delibird Delivery ②" (VSデリバード②, VS Deribādo ②); 115. "Forretress of Solitude" (VSフォレトス, VS Foretosu; "VS Foretos"); 116. "Rock, Paper... Scizor" (VSハッサム, VS Hassamu; "VS Hassam")
Despite suffering defeat at Mask of Ice's hands, Gold continues travelling around Johto, participating in competitions and managing to hatch a Togepi from an Egg he was given. He is sent on a mission to find the Gym Leader Jasmine, who disappeared after a supposed earthquake hit Ecruteak City. He finds her unconscious in a lighthouse called Tin Tower, where he and Silver are ambushed by Team Rocket. After fending off the criminals, Gold challenges Silver to a battle in order to tell him about his and Team Rocket's objectives. Although Silver wins, he reveals that Team Rocket wants to find the Legendary Bird, Ho-Oh through their attacks with him, opposing them as they share the same objectives. Gold allies with Silver and the two are opposed by Mask of Ice, who kidnapped Silver as a kid and wants to kill him due to past betrayal. Despite their efforts, Gold and Silver are defeated. Meanwhile in Kanto, Red decides to travel to Mt. Silver to heal his limbs, which are still severely weakened by Lorelei's ice, while Yellow decides to investigate about Ho-Oh.
10	—	August 8, 2001; 4-09-149340-8	December 7, 2010; 978-1-4215-3063-5
117. "Slugging It Out With Slugma" (VSマグマッグ, VS Magumaggu; "VS Magmag"); 118. "Three Cheers for Chikorita" (VSチコリータ, VS Chikorīta; "VS Chicorita"); 119. "A Flaaffy Kerfuffle" (VSモココ; "VS Mokoko"); 120. "Surrounded by Staryu" (VSヒトデマン; "VS Hitodeman"); 121. "Off Course with Corsola" (VSサニーゴ, VS Sanīgo; "VS Sunnygo"); 122. "Querulous Qwilfish" (VSハリーセン, VS Harīsen; "VS Harysen); 123. "Debonaire Dragonair" (VSハクリュー, VS Hakuryū; "VS Hakuryu"); 124. "Scrappy Skarmory" (VSエアームド, VS Eāmudo; "VS Airmd"); 125. "Misdreavus Misgivings" (VSムウマ, VS Mūma; "VS Muma"); 126. "Jumping Jumpluff" (VSワタッコ, VS Watakko; "VS Watacco"); 127. "Miltank Melee" (VSミルタンク, VS Mirutanku); 128. "Indubitably Ditto" (VSメタモン; "VS Metamon"); 129. "Great Girafarig" (VSキリンリキ; ""VS Kirinriki")
Professor Oak gives the third Johto Pokédex to Crystal, in order gather data from all the Pokémon that exist. Crystal accepts the quest in exchange for renovating an academy where she was working at. During her work, Crystal finds one of the three Legendary Beasts, Suicune and decides to track it and capture it. Running around Johto, Suicune faces several Gym Leaders, but none of them are able to defeat it. Crystal later finds herself competing with a Trainer named Eusine to see who will capture Suicune, and both end up joining forces to stop Team Rocket members from capturing it.
11	—	December 25, 2001; 4-09-149711-X	February 1, 2011; 978-1-4215-3545-6
130. "Suddenly Suicune I" (VSスイクン(前編), VS Suikun (Zenpen); "VS Suikun (Part 1)"); 131. "Suddenly Suicune II" (VSスイクン(中編), VS Suikun (Chōhen); "VS Suikun (Part 2)"); 132. "Suddenly Suicune III" (VSスイクン(後編), VS Suikun (Kōhen); "VS Suikun (Part 3)"); 133. "Absolutely Azumarill!" (VSマリルリ, VS Mariruri; "VS Marilli"); 134. "Hurray for Heracross" (VSヘラクロス, VS Herakurosu; "VS Heracros"); 135. "Lively Larvitar" (VSヨーギラス, VS Yōgirasu; "VS Yogiras"); 136. "Crossing Crobat (VSクロバット, VS Kurobatto; "VS Crobat"); 137. "Really Raikou & Entirely Entei I" (VSライコウ&エンテイ(前編), VS Raikō & Entei (Zenpen 1); "VS Raikou and Entei (Part 1)"); 138. "Really Raikou & Entirely Entei II" (VSライコウ&エンテイ(後編), VS Raikō & Entei (Kōhen); "VS Raikou and Entei (Part 2)"); 139. "Raising Raichu" (VSライチュウ, VS Raichū; "VS Raichu"); 140. "Do-Si-Do With Dodrio" (VSドードリオ, VS Dōdorio; "VS Dodorio"); 141. "Hello, Lickitung" (VSベロリンガ; "VS Beroringa"); 142. "Really Remoraid!" (VSテッポウオ, VS Teppōo; "VS Teppouo")
Crystal fights Suicune in Tin Tower, but is unable to capture it, and the Legendary Pokémon escapes. Rather than continuing tracking Suicune, Crystal continues training to improve her skills, while other Gym Leaders face two other Legendary Beasts, Entei and Raikou, which are also impossible to capture. Crystal later meets Yellow, who was assigned by Professor Oak to help her capture the three Legendary Beasts that have appeared in Johto and is revealed to have been the one who had woken them up from their sleep. Yellow joins Crystal in her journey and goes to the Whirl Islands.
12	—	April 26, 2002; 4-09-149712-8	April 5, 2011; 978-1-4215-3546-3
143. "Irked Igglybuff and Curmudgeonly Cleffa" (VSピィ&ププリン, VS Pii & Pupurin; "VS Py & Pupurin"); 144. "Savvy Swinub" (VSウリムー, VS Urimū; "VS Urimoo"); 145. "Sandslash Surprise" (VSサンドパン, VS Sandopan; "VS Sandpan"); 146. "Lively Lugia I" (VSルギア(前編), VS Rugia (Zenpen); "VS Lugia (Part 1)"); 147. "Lively Lugia I" (VSルギア(中編), VS Rugia (Chōhen); "VS Lugia (Part 2)"); 148. "Lively Lugia I" (VSルギア(後編), VS Rugia (Kōhen); "VS Lugia (Part 3)"); 149. "Curious Kingdra" (VSキングドラ, VS Kingudora; "VS Kingdra"); 150. "Chinchou in Charge" (VSチョンチー, VS Chonchī; "VS Chonchie"); 151. "Lovely Lanturn" (VSランターン, VS Rantān; "VS Lantern"); 152. "Buzz Off, Butterfree!" (VSバタフリー, VS Batafurī; "VS Butterfree"); 153. "Oh, It's Ho-Oh!" (VSホウオウ, VS Houou; "VS Houou"); 154. "Yikes, It's Yanma!" (VSヤンヤンマ, VS Yanyanma; "VS Yanyanma")
Saved by Entei from Mask of Ice, Gold and Silver awake in a sea cave located at the Whirl Islands and are collected by Lt. Surge. However, Lugia (the same one that was previously released from Lance's control by Yellow) appears and goes berserk, attacking the area. During Lugia's attack, Gold and Silver meet Crystal and use their starter Pokémon to try and capture Lugia. When Lugia escapes, Silver leaves to meet his comrade Lance, while Gold joins Crystal. Meanwhile, the Pokémon Association decides to arrange a tournament between Kanto's and Johto's Gym Leaders in order to promote their challenges. After learning of the competition, the Gym Leaders prepare to go the Pokémon League for the competition with Kanto's Cerulean City's leader Misty capturing Suicune on the way. Gold and Crystal get to the stadium before the tournament starts, believing Mask of Ice is one of the sixteen participants.
13	—	August 28, 2002; 4-09-149713-6	June 7, 2011; 978-1-4215-3547-0
155. "Capital Kabutops (VSカブトプス, VS Kabutopusu; "VS Kabutops"); 156. "Notorious Noctowl" (VSヨルノズク, VS Yorunozuku; "VS Yorunozuku"); 157. "Magnificent Magnemite" (VSコイル, VS Koiru; "VS Coil"); 158. "Silly Scyther" (VSストライク, VS Sutoraiku; "VS Strike"); 159. "Popular Pupitar" (VSサナギラス, VS Sanagirasu; "VS Sanagiras"); 160. "Playful Porygon2" (VSポリゴン2, VS Porigon 2; "VS Porygon2"); 161. "Entranced by Entei" (VSエンテイ; "VS Entei"); 162. "Heckled by Hitmontop" (VSカポエラー, VS Kapoerā; "VS Kapoerer"); 163. "Bringing Up Bellossom" (VSキレイハナ; "VS Kireihana"); 164. "Slick Slowking" (VSヤドキング, VS Yadokingu; "VS Yadoking"); 165. "Lugia and Ho-Oh on the Loose (Part 1)" (VSルギア&ホウオウ(前編), VS Rugia & Hōō (Zenpen); "VS Lugia & Houou (Part 1)"); 166. "Lugia and Ho-Oh on the Loose (Part 1)" (VSルギア&ホウオウ(後編), VS Rugia & Hōō (Kōhen); "VS Lugia & Houou (Part 2)")
The tournament begins with both Kanto and Johto reaching a tie following five battles. Meanwhile, Lance reveals to Silver that Mask of Ice wishes to control time with his underlings searching for Lugia and Ho-Oh, meanwhile Green, who is revealed to be Silver's adoptive sister, had already stolen the Rainbow and Silver Wings, which are required to control the two Legendary birds. Silver then goes to the Pokémon League after learning of Gold's beliefs with the tournament current ongoing. Team Rocket invades and control the stadium with Mask of Ice now having Ho-oh and Lugia under his control. He goes to attack Kurt, a famous Poké Ball creator, in order to have him create a GS Ball so he can "capture time".
14	—	January 28, 2003; 4-09-149714-4	August 2, 2011; 978-1-4215-3548-7
167. "The Last Battle I" (最終決戦I, Saishū Kessen I); 168. "The Last Battle II" (最終決戦II, Saishū Kessen II); 169. "The Last Battle III" (最終決戦III, Saishū Kessen III); 170. "The Last Battle IV" (最終決戦IV, Saishū Kessen IV); 171. "The Last Battle V" (最終決戦V, Saishū Kessen V); 172. "The Last Battle VI" (最終決戦VI, Saishū Kessen VI); 173. "The Last Battle VII" (最終決戦VII, Saishū Kessen VII); 174. "The Last Battle VIII" (最終決戦VIII, Saishū Kessen VIII); 175. "The Last Battle IX" (最終決戦IX, Saishū Kessen IX); 176. "The Last Battle X" (最終決戦X, Saishū Kessen X); 177. "The Last Battle XI" (最終決戦XI, Saishū Kessen XI); 178. "The Last Battle XII" (最終決戦XII, Saishū Kessen XII); 179. "The Last Battle XIII" (最終決戦XIII, Saishū Kessen XIII)
Revealing themselves as the respective trainers of Entei and Raikou, Blaine and Lt. Surge join Misty and Suicune to help fight against Lugia and Ho-Oh. Mask of Ice easily escapes, but during an encounter with Gold, his mask is removed, revealing his identity as Mahogany Town's Gym Leader, Pryce. Green searches for Pryce, but is attacked by his underlings. It is also seen that the Rainbow and Silver Wings are actually in Yellow's straw hat. Green attacks Pryce's underlings with Articuno, Zapdos and Moltres, which are later used alongside Red and Blue to fight Pryce's legendary birds. Meanwhile, Pryce completes the GS Ball and escapes after defeating Gold, who still does not give up on stopping him. With help from the Pokémon Association, Lugia and Ho-Oh are released from Pryce's control, leaving him to fight all Pokédex holders with exception of Gold.

==== Ruby & Sapphire chapter ====
No.	Title	Original release date	English release date
15	—	July 28, 2003; 4-09-149715-2	March 5, 2013; 978-1-4215-3549-4
180. "The Last Battle XIV" (最終決戦XIV, Saishū Kessen XIV) (Included in Volume 14 of Viz Media release); 181. "Creeping Past Cacnea" (VSサボネア: 新たなる物語, VS Sabonea: Shintanaru Monogatari; "VS Sabonea: A New Story"); 182. "Making Mirth with Mightyena" (VSグラエナ: 衝撃の出会い, VS Guraena: Shōgeki no Deai; "VS Guraena: A Rival, a Friend"); 183. "Trying to Trounce Torchic" (VSアチャモ: 80日後の約束, VS Achamo: 80 Higo no Yakusoku; "VS Achamo: 80-Days Challenge"); 184. "Distracting Dustox" (VSドクケイル: コンテスト指導, VS Dokukeiru: Kontesuto Shidō; "VS Dokucale: Training for the Contest"); 185. "Nixing Nuzleaf" (VSコノハナ: 恐怖のニアミス, VS Konohana: Kyōfu no Nia Misu; "VS Konohana: Close Terror"); 186. "Brushing Past Breloom" (VSキノガッサ: ルビーとミツル, VS Kinogassa: Rubī to Mitsuru; "VS Kinogassa: Ruby and Mitsuru"); 187. "Tongue-Tied Kecleon" (VSカクレオン: はじめての捕獲, VS Kakureon: Hajimete no Hakaku; "VS Kakureon: The First Capture"); 188. "Lombre Larceny" (VSハスブレロ: 給水口の中に, VS Hasuburero: Kyūmizuguchi no Nakani; "VS Hasubrero: Inside the Fountain"); 189. "Moving Down Ludicolo" (VSルンパッパ: 対決青装束, VS Runpappa: Taiketsu Aoshōzoku; "VS Runpappa: Clash with the Team in Blue"); 190. "Blowing Past Nosepass I" (VSノズパスI: カナズミジムの試験, VS Nozupasu I: Kanazumi Jimu no Shiken; "VS Nosepass I: Kanazumi Gym Challenge")
At a shrine in Ilex Forest while using Kurt's GS Ball, Pryce manages to capture Celebi, a Time Travel Pokémon that controls time. With the help of the Rainbow and Silver Wing (still attached to Yellow's straw hat), Gold is able to escape from the trap. Gold, Silver and Crystal enters the shrine with both wings to track down Pryce as he is adamant in changing the past where La Glace (Lapras) can be reunited with its parents. Gold attacks Pryce alone with a newborn Pichu (hatched from Red's Pika and Yellow's Chu Chu), and the other Pokédex holders show support from outside the shrine, to free Celebi from the GS Ball, and the same time, causes Pryce to be lost to time. After Team Rocket's defeat, Crystal completes Kanto's and Johto's Pokédex, while Gold and Red train together at Mt. Silver. The story then moves to the Hoenn region, where a young boy named Ruby who wishes to become the champion in a Pokémon Contest. Unable to handle the pressure from his father, a new Hoenn Gym Leader named Norman, to fight Pokémon battles, Ruby runs away from home. He meets a girl named Sapphire who lives in a cave, and her dream is to defeat all the Gym Leaders in the Hoenn region. The two make a deal to pursue their dreams for 80 days, then reunite again in the same spot where they first met. The two begin on their separate journeys, as Ruby helps a frail boy named Wally to capture his first Pokémon, while Sapphire heads to Rusboro City to face the Gym Leader, Roxanne.
16	From Dewford to Slateport; From Dewford to Slateport (ムロからカイナヘ)	October 28, 2003; 4-09-149716-0	May 7, 2013; 978-1-4215-3550-0
191. "Blowing Past Nosepass II" (VSノズパスII: 特性 磁力を破れ, VS Nozupasu II: Tokusei Jiryoku o Yabure; "VS Nosepass II: Break the Magnet Pull"); 192. "Stick This in Your Craw, Crawdaunt I" (VSシザリガーI: 海のならず者, VS Shizariger I: Umi no Narazumono; "VS Shizariger I: Sea Vagabond"); 193. "Stick This in Your Craw, Crawdaunt II" (VSシザリガーII: 明かせない力, VS Shizariger II: Aka se Nai Chikara; "VS Shizariger II: Unknown Strength"); 194. "Guile from Mawile" (VSクチート: あざむきの大郡, VS Kucheat: Azamuki no Dai Gun; "VS Kucheat: Deceptive Cuteness"); 195. "Mashing Makuhita" (VSマクノシタ: 柔の奥儀, VS Makunoshita: Yawara no Oku Tadashi; "VS Makunoshita: The Esoteric to Supple"); 196. "Ring Ring Goes Beldum" (VSダンバル: 洞窟の実力者, VS Danbaru: Doukutsu no Jitsuryoku Sha; "VS Dumbber: Champion in the Cave"); 197. "Heavy Hitting Hariyama" (VSハリテヤマ: 決着のカウンター, VS Hariteyama: Ketchaku no Kauntā; "VS Hariteyama: Counter Strike"); 198. "Adding It Up with Plusle & Minun I" (VSプラスル&マイナンI: もう1つの巨悪, VS Purasuru & Minun I: Mou Hitotsu no Kyo Aku; "VS Plusle & Minun I: Another Evil Presence"); 199. "Adding It Up with Plusle & Minun II" (VSプラスル&マイナンII: 船上のダブルバトル, VS Purasuru & Minun II: Senjou no Daburu Batoru; "VS Plusle & Minun II: Double Battle Onboard"); 200. "Tripped Up by Torkoal" (VSコータス:赤装束再び, VS kōtasu:Aka Shouzoku Futatabi; "VS Cotoise: The Team in Red, Once More"); 201. "Slugging It Out with Slugma I" (VSマグマッグI: 潜水艇かいえん1号, VS Magumaggu I: Sensui Ten Kaien 1 Gou; "VS Magmag I: SS Kaien 1")
Sapphire wins her first fight and proceeds to search for the Trainer Steven Stone from an errand. Both Ruby and Sapphire end up in Dewford Town where the former meets Steven during an investigation and the latter fights Gym Leader Brawly. Learning that Ruby met Steven, Sapphire forces him to join in her journey until finding him. Following an encounter with two members from the criminal organization Team Magma - Courtney and Tabitha, which managed to get Scanner from Abandoned Ship. The pair splits up again after reaching at Slateport City. Ruby is held hostage in another attack by Team Magma in an assault towards a Hoenn researcher.
17	Battle of Father and Son; Battle of the Parent-Child (親子の戦い)	February 28, 2004; 4-09-149717-9	July 2, 2013; 978-1-4215-3551-7
202. "Slugging It Out with Slugma II" (VSマグマッグII: 炎の幻影, VS Magumaggu II: Honoo no Genei; "VS Magma II: Shadow of Fire"); 203. "I'm Your Biggest Fan, Donphan" (VSドンファン: 襲いくるカラクリ, VS Donfan: Osoi Kuru Karakuri; "VS Donfan: Rampaging Robot"); 204. "Plugging Past Electrike I" (VSラクライI: 地下に眠る都市, VS Rakurai I: Chika ni Nemuru Toshi; "VS Rakurai I: City that sleeps in Underground"); 205. "Plugging Past Electrike II" (VSラクライII: 発電マシンを倒せ, VS Rakurai II: Hatsuden Mashin o Taose; "VS Rakurai II: Fight the Generator"); 206. "Not So Fetching Feebas" (VSヒンバス: 釣り上げて 逃げられて, VS Hinbasu: Tsuriage te Nige Rare te; "VS Hinbass: Fishing and Escaping"); 207. "On the Loose and Hyper With Zangoose and Seviper I" (VSザングース&ハブネークI: 恐ろしき決闘, VS Zangūsu & Habunake I: Osoroshiki Kettou; "VS Zangoose & Habunake I: "Ferocious Battle); 208. "On the Loose and Hyper With Zangoose and Seviper II" (VSザングース&ハブネークII: 執念の追跡者, VS Zangūsu & Habunake II: Shuunen no Tsuiseki Sha; "VS Zangoose & Habunake II: Determined Pursuer"); 209. "Hanging Around With Slaking I" (VSケッキング: 3つ目の選択肢, VS Kekkingu I: Mittsu me no Sentakushi; "VS Kekking I: The Third Choice"); 210. "Hanging Around With Slaking II" (VSケッキング: すれ違う心, VS Kekkingu II: Surechigau Kokoro; "VS Kekking II: Uncrossed Hearts"); 211. "Hanging Around With Slaking III" (VSケッキング: 父の思い, VS Kekkingu III: Chichi no Omoi; "VS Kekking III: Father's Love"); 212. "Bubble Bubble Toil and Azumarill I" (VSマリルリI: ロープウェイの罠, VS Mariruri I: Ropeway no Wana; "VS Marilli I: Ropeway Trap"); 213. "Bubble Bubble Toil and Azumarill II" (VSマリルリII: 息詰まる攻防, VS Mariruri II: Ikidumaru Koubou; "VS Marilli II: Suffocating Attack"); 214. "Assaulted by Pelipper I" (VSペリッパーI: 火山活動停止, VS Perippā I: Kazan Katsudou Teishi; "VS Pelipper I: Volcano no More")
Revealing himself to be a skilled fighter, Ruby fights Team Magma and escapes after the group stole Submarine Explorer 1 from the researchers. Meanwhile, Sapphire wins her third Gym Badge while helping Gym Leader Wattson to investigate an underground power plant - New Mauville. Team Magma's interactions with Ruby help Norman to track down his son who is still completing Pokémon contests. When Norman finds Ruby, he attacks Ruby for running away from home, but Ruby fights back to prove his determination. As the fight is interrupted, Norman allows Ruby to continue his journey and left. Back to Sapphire's journey, she finds that Team Aqua, another criminal organization, kidnapped Lavaridge's Gym Leader Flannery to know about her to trick a scientist with their mission. Team Aqua then proceeds to stop the volcanic activities from Mt. Chimney, starting the awakening of Legendary Pokémon.
18	The Warriors Gather; The Gathering of the Warriors (戦士の集合)	June 19, 2004; 4-09-149718-7	September 3, 2013; 978-1-4215-3552-4
215. "Assaulted by Pelipper II" (VSペリッパーII: 意外なる救援, VS Perippā II: Igai Naru Kyuuen; "VS Pelipper II: Unlikely Savior"); 216. "Mixing It Up with Magcargo" (VSマグカルゴ: 決意の再出発, VS Magukarugo: Ketsui no Sai Shuppatsu; "VS Magcargot: Setting Off Again"); 217. "Mind-Boggling with Medicham" (VSチャーレム: シダケのコンテスト, VS Chāremu: Shidake no Contest; "VS Charem: Shidake Contest"); 218. "It's Absol-utely a Bad Omen" (VSアブソル: わざわいの予兆, VS Abusoru: Waza Wai no Yochou; "VS Absol: Disaster Premonition"); 219. "What Would You Do for a Whismur?" (VSゴニョニョ: 激震 カナシダトンネル, VS Gonyonyo: Gekishin Kanashida Tunnel; "VS Gonyonyo: Rumbling Kanashida Tunnel"); 220. "Going to Eleven with Loudred & Exploud I" (VSドゴーム&バクオングI: 誘惑の篝火, VS Dogōmu & Bakuongu I: Yuuwaku no Kagaribi; "VS Dogohmb & Bakuong I: Seductive Flames"); 221. "Going to Eleven with Loudred & Exploud II" (VSドゴーム&バクオングII: 脱出 そして, VS Dogōmu & Bakuongu II: Dasshutsu Soshite; "VS Dogohmb & Bakuong II: Escape, And..."); 222. "Short Shift for Shiftry" (VSダーテング: 招集 ジムリーダーズ, VS Dātengu: Shoushuu Gym Leaders; "VS Dirteng: Gym Leaders Gather"); 223. "I More Than Like You, Luvdisc I" (VSラブカスI: 出場 スーパーランク, VS Rabukasu I: Shutsujou Super Rank; "VS Lovecus I: Great Rank Contest"); 224. "I More Than Like You, Luvdisc II" (VSラブカスII: 美しさの覇者, VS Rabukasu II: Utsukushi sa no Hasha; "VS Lovecus II: King of Beauty"); 225. "Tanks, but No Tanks, Anorith & Lileep" (VSアノプス&リリーラ: 美の師弟コンビ, VS Anopusu & Rirīra: Bi no Shitei Konbi; "VS Anopth & Lilyla: Master and Disciple of Beauty"); 226. "I Dare Ya, Altaria... Knock Chic off My Shoulder" (VSチルタリス: ヒマワキでの再会, VS Chirutarisu: Hiwamaki de no Saikai; "VS Tyltalis: Hiwamaki Reunion")
In order to achieve to awaken the Legendary Pokémon Kyogre, Team Aqua put into a cease the volcanic activity at Mt. Chimney. Sapphire and Flannery tries to stop them, but is unsuccessful. Being frustrated, Sapphire head from Lavaridge Town to Fortree City. Meanwhile, Ruby helps trapped workers when Team Magma causes Rusturf Tunnel to collapse. Then he manages to win all categories at Normal Rank Pokémon Contest. But while at Fallabour Town, Ruby meets Wallace, and decided insists to becoming Wallace's pupil. Later, Ruby and Sapphire meet at Fortree City, where all the Gym Leaders (except Norman, Tate and Liza) were gather for an emergency meeting.
19	Fighting the Evil; Fighting the Evil (巨悪共闘)	October 28, 2004; 4-09-149719-5	November 5, 2013; 978-1-4215-3553-1
227. "I'm Always Grumpig First Thing in the Morning I" (VSブーピッグI: 素直な気持ちで, VS Būpiggu I: Sunao na Kimochi de; "VS Boopig I: True Feelings"); 228. "I'm Always Grumpig First Thing in the Morning II" (VSブーピッグII: 明かされた力, VS Būpiggu II: Akasa re ta Chikara; "VS Boopig II: Hidden Strength"); 229. "You Can Fight Day or Night With Lunatone & Solrock" (VSルナトーン&ソルロック: ふたつの宝珠, VS Runatōn & Sorurokku: Futatsu no Houshu; "VS Lunatone & Solrock: The Two Jewels"); 230. "Walrein and Camerupt" (VSトドゼルガ: 巨悪共闘, VS Todoseruga: Kyo Aku Kyoutou; "VS Todoseruga: Fighting the Evil"); 231. "Master Class with Masquerain" (VSアメモース: それぞれの復活前夜, VS Amemōsu: Sorezore no Fukkatsu Zenya; "VS Amemoth: Eve of Revival"); 232. "Always Keep Whiscash on You for Emergencies" (VSナマズン: 涙のハイパーランク, VS Namazun: Namida no Hyper Rank; "VS Namazun: A Sorrowful Ultra Rank"); 233. "The Beginning of the End with Kyogre & Groudon I" (VSカイオーガ&グラードンI: 到着 最深海, VS Kaiōga & Gurādon I: Touchaku Sai Shinkai; "VS Kyogre & Groudon I: Arrival at the Deepest Sea"); 234. "The Beginning of the End with Kyogre & Groudon II" (VSカイオーガ&グラードンII: 超古代獣 目覚める, VS Kaiōga & Gurādon II: Chou Kodai Juu Mezameru; "VS Kyogre & Groudon II: The Ancient Monsters Awaken"); 235. "The Beginning of the End with Kyogre & Groudon III" (VSカイオーガ&グラードンIII: 被害地へ飛べ, VS Kaiōga & Gurādon III: Higai Chi he Tobe; "VS Kyogre & Groudon III: To the Rescue"); 236. "The Beginning of the End with Kyogre & Groudon IV" (VSカイオーガ&グラードンIV: 真実の伝説者, VS Kaiōga & Gurādon IV: Shinjitsu no Densetsu Sha; "VS Kyogre & Groudon IV: Messenger of Truth"); 237. "The Beginning of the End with Kyogre & Groudon V" (VSカイオーガ&グラードンV: 甦る記憶, VS Kaiōga & Gurādon V: Yomigaeru Kioku; "VS Kyogre & Groudon V: Memories Once More"); 238. "The Beginning of the End with Kyogre & Groudon VI" (VSカイオーガ&グラードンVI: ただ1つの道, VS Kaiōga & Gurādon VI: Tada Hitotsu no Michi; "VS Kyogre & Groudon VI: The Only Path")
Ruby arrives to the meeting of Gym Leaders, where Sapphire discovers his abilities for Pokémon Battles. However, Ruby refuses to aid the Gym Leaders and leaves, much to Sapphire's anger. At Lilycove City, Wallace follows Ruby in secret and takes part at Hyper Rank Pokémon Contest. He scolds Ruby for his selfish behaviour and causes Ruby's Feebas lost for Beauty Category as a result. In the meantime where Maxie and Archie decide to join forces and enters to Seafloor Cavern to awake Groudon and Kyogre, which starts a natural disaster throughout Hoenn region. Soon after Sapphire discovered Relicanth, Ruby decides to join her and told its ability - which allows to travel into Seafloor Cavern where both team leaders are current located.
20	The Third Journey; The Third Journey (第3の旅立ち)	April 26, 2005; 4-09-149720-9	January 7, 2014; 978-1-4215-3554-8
239. "The Beginning of the End with Kyogre & Groudon VII" (VSカイオーガ&グラードンVII: 空飛ぶ協会本部, VS Kaiōga & Gurādon VII: Sora Tobu Kyoukai Honbu; "VS Kyogre & Groudon VII: Pokémon Association Afloat"); 240. "Talk About Timing, Treecko" (VSキモリ: あのときの願いを, VS Kimori:; "VS Kimori: Granting an Old Wish"); 241. "Dreadful Dealing with Dusclops" (VSサマヨール: 天空の修練場, VS Samayouru: Tenkuu no Shuuren Jou; "VS Samayouru: Training in the Sky"); 242. "Very Vexing Volbeat" (VSバルビート: 裏切りの総帥, VS Barubīto: Uragiri no Sousui; "VS Barubeat: Betrayed by the Leader"); 243. "No Armaldo Is an Island" (VSアーマルド: マルチバトル開始, VS Āmarudo: Maruchi Batoru Kaishi; "VS Armaldo: Multiple Battles Begin"); 244. "The Beginning of the End with Kyogre & Groudon VIII" (VSカイオーガ&グラードンVIII: 戦う意志のもとに, VS Kaiōga & Gurādon VIII: Tatakau Ishi no Moto ni; "VS Kyogre & Groudon VIII: Battle as One"); 245. "Bravo, Vibrava" (VSビブラーバ: 激突 スリーonスリー, Vs Biburāba: Gekitotsu Surī on Surī; "VS Biburāba: Three on Three"); 246. "Can I Ninjask You a Question?" (VSテッカニン: もう1匹いる, VS Tekkanin: Mō Ichihiki Iru; "VS Tekkanin: The Other Pokémon"); 247. "The Beginning of the End with Kyogre & Groudon IX" (VSカイオーガ&グラードンIX: 幻をうちやぶれ, VS Kaiōga & Gurādon IX: Maboroshi o Uchiyabure; "VS Kyogre & Groudon IX: Burning the Illusions"); 248. "The Beginning of the End with Kyogre & Groudon X" (VSカイオーガ&グラードンX: 宝珠の魔力, VS Kaiōga & Gurādon X: Houshu no Maryoku; "VS Kyogre & Groudon X: Prowess of the Jewels"); 249. "The Beginning of the End with Kyogre & Groudon XI" (VSカイオーガ&グラードンXI: 引かれあう超パワー, VS Kaiōga & Gurādon XI: Hika re au Chou Pawā; "VS Kyogre & Groudon XI: Powers that Attract")
Wally prepares his training with Norman at Sky Tower. At Seafloor Cavern where Ruby and Sapphire manage to defeat Team Magma Leader Maxie and Team Aqua Leader Archie. However, the two leaders were being controlled by the Red Orb and the Blue Orb which cause berserk. Meanwhile, the Gym Leaders gather their strength to stop Ancient Pokémon - but the situation getting worst when both Admins of Team Magma and Team Aqua shows up. Finally it becomes clear as Groudon and Kyogre, together Ruby and Sapphire were drag out - were head to Sootopolis City in the process.
