= Kuramoto (surname) =

Kuramoto (written: 倉本 or 蔵本) is a Japanese surname. Notable people with the surname include:

- Hidenori Kuramoto (蔵本 英智, born 1976), Japanese baseball player and coach
- Koji Kuramoto (蔵本 孝二, born 1951), Japanese judoka
- Masahiro Kuramoto (倉本 昌弘, born 1955), Japanese golfer
- Sō Kuramoto (倉本 聰, born 1934), Japanese playwright and screenwriter
- Takashi Kuramoto (倉本 崇史, born 1984), Japanese footballer
- Toshihiko Kuramoto (倉本 寿彦, born 1991), Japanese baseball player
- Yoshiki Kuramoto (蔵本 由紀, born 1940), Japanese physicist
