= Pokémon Sleep =

2023 mobile video game

- Logo
- Developers: Select Button (2023–2024); The Pokémon Works (2024–)
- Publisher: The Pokémon Company
- Composer: Shota Kageyama
- Series: Pokémon
- Platforms: iOS, Android
- Release: CA/AU/NZ/Latam: July 17, 2023; EU/Africa/Middle East: July 18, 2023; Asia (except some countries): July 19, 2023; JP/US: July 20, 2023
- Genre: Simulation
- Mode: Single-player

Pokémon Sleep is a sleep-tracking video game that rewards the user with Pokémon depending on the quality of their sleep. The app was first released in Japan, Australia, Canada, New Zealand, and Latin American countries for Android and iOS on July 17, 2023.

== Gameplay ==
Pokémon Sleep is based around tracking the sleep of the player, and earning rewards for sleeping longer. The game uses the microphone and accelerometer of the player's phone to track sleep. Players can optionally use the Pokémon Go Plus+ to play sounds to remind the player of their bedtime, as well as to track sleep without needing a phone on. In September 2024 smartwatches were added as a sleep tracking method.

Players are given a Snorlax by Professor Neroli to observe its sleeping patterns when they start playing for the first time. The player can give Snorlax berries and meals throughout the day. The more Snorlax is fed, the higher its power, and the more types of Pokémon it can attract. After reaching certain milestones with Snorlax's score, its rank will increase, allowing rarer visiting Pokémon after sleep.

After each sleep session, the player is given a report based on how they slept. In this report, sleep is categorized into three different types: Dozing, Snoozing, and Slumbering. The type of sleep that makes up most of the total sleeping time is the overall sleep type, unless an equal amount makes it a "Balanced Type". The report also states how much noise they made throughout their sleep. Based on these factors, the player is given a Sleep Score.

When the player is finished reading their report, their Sleep Score is multiplied by Snorlax's score to give a final Drowsy Power. The higher Drowsy Power received, the more Pokémon the player will be visited by.

Pokémon are classified into the same three different types as sleep, being Dozing, Snoozing, and Slumbering. Based on the type of sleep the player received, they will get that type of Pokémon visiting them. Pokémon have multiple sleep styles that are recorded in the Sleep-Style Dex. After recording the sleep styles of the visiting Pokémon, the player can feed the Pokémon PokéBiscuits to gain friendship with the Pokémon. If the player gains enough friendship with the Pokémon, it will join the player, and can be put on a team to collect berries and ingredients.

Pokémon Sleep also runs in-game events throughout the year where players can receive additional bonuses. Events coincide with holidays, lunar phases, or they showcase new Pokémon or items added to the game.

== Development ==
Pokémon Sleep is developed by Japanese studio Select Button, and published by The Pokémon Company. It was announced on May 28, 2019, by Tsunekazu Ishihara, CEO of the Pokémon Company, during a press conference held in Tokyo as well as on the company's official Twitter page. The app was set to be released in 2020, but did not appear, leading to speculation that it was cancelled. However, on 5 April 2021, a fan reported on Twitter that a SSL certificate had been registered for dev-eotxawxn.sleep.pokemon.co.jp.

A Pokémon Go APK data mine in January 2022 revealed several additions to the Pokémon Go app to integrate with Pokémon Sleep, including connecting to the Pokémon Go Plus + accessory, reviewing sleep patterns, and earning in-app rewards. These were confirmed by the Pokémon Day 2023 Pokémon Presents, in which they officially announced the Pokémon Go Plus + (Plus Plus) Accessory.

On February 27, 2023, Pokémon Sleep was showcased during the Pokémon Presents and set for a release sometime in the summer of 2023. From July 6, 2023, Android users could pre-register the app. On July 17, 2023, Pokémon Sleep was rolled out in Australia, Canada, New Zealand, and Latin American countries.

In 2024, The Pokémon Company announced that development of the game would be transferred to The Pokémon Works, a joint venture established by the company and ILCA.

== Reception ==
Upon the app's second anniversary in July 2025, it was announced that it had been downloaded over 28 million times and had recorded over one billion sleep sessions. In April 2026, the developers announced that the game has reached 30 million downloads.
