= Sudowoodo =

Pokémon species

- Pokémon character
- Sudowoodo artwork by Ken Sugimori
- First game: Pokémon Gold and Silver (1999)
- Designed by: Ken Sugimori
- Voiced by: English: Bill Rogers; Japanese: Keiji Fujiwara; Kiyotaka Furushima; Daisuke Sakaguchi; Yuina; Tatsuki Kobe

In-universe information
- Species: Pokémon
- Type: Rock

Sudowoodo (/ˌsuːdoʊˈwuːdoʊ/), known in Japan as Usokkie (Japanese: ウソッキー, Hepburn: Usokkī), is a Pokémon species in Nintendo and Game Freak's Pokémon media franchise, and the evolved form of the Pokémon Bonsly. First introduced in the video games Pokémon Gold and Silver, it began as a relatively rare Pokémon, serving as an obstacle that blocks the player's path, until becoming more common starting with Pokémon Diamond and Pearl, in which Bonsly was introduced. Since Sudowoodo's debut, it has appeared in multiple games including Pokémon Go and the Pokémon Trading Card Game, as well as various merchandise.

Classified as a Rock-type Pokémon, Sudowoodo mimics trees, standing still with its arms up. When exposed to water, it will run or lash out against the player-character for spraying them. Due to its tree mimicry, players of Gold and Silver were often confused to discover that it was not a Grass-type Pokémon. Its resemblance to trees is touched upon, sometimes seen with other tree-like Pokémon species and a specific Sudowoodo becoming a Grass-type Pokémon when using an ability called Terastallization. It has been a source of inspiration for multiple bands, including Pinguini Tattici Nucleari, which named a song after it, and Moglebaum, a German band named after its German name.

== Conception and development ==
Sudowoodo is a species of fictional creatures called Pokémon created for the Pokémon media franchise. Developed by Game Freak and published by Nintendo, the Japanese franchise began in 1996 with the video games Pokémon Red and Green for the Game Boy, which were later released in North America as Pokémon Red and Blue in 1998. In these games and their sequels, the player assumes the role of a Trainer whose goal is to capture and use the creatures' special abilities to combat other Pokémon. Some Pokémon can transform into stronger species through a process called evolution via various means, such as exposure to specific items. Each Pokémon have one or two elemental types, which define its advantages and disadvantages when battling other Pokémon. A major goal in each game is to complete the Pokédex, a comprehensive Pokémon encyclopedia, by capturing, evolving, and trading with other Trainers to obtain individuals from all Pokémon species.

Sudowoodo was first introduced in Pokémon Gold and Silver. When developing the games, around 300 individual Pokémon designs were drafted by various development team members, with each deciding their names and features and revising the drafts as needed. During this process, the team actively tried to avoid vague design concepts, as they felt this had caused difficulty creating completed Pokémon during the development of Red and Blue. Once the team selected which Pokémon to be included, their designs were drawn and finalized by lead artist Ken Sugimori. To maintain balance, many of the newer species did not appear in the early stages of the game. Additionally, many of the Pokémon were designed with merchandise in mind, taking into account the related Pokémon toy line and anime series. As a result, designs often had to be kept simplistic, something that caused strain for Sugimori and affected his approach with the next Pokémon franchise titles, Pokémon Ruby and Sapphire. Compared to the species introduced in the first generation, many of the second generation species have more obvious origins based on animals, plants, or myths; they were also designed with a rural Japanese influence due to a significant amount being based on animals known to live in a "temperate forest environment." In Pokémon Diamond and Pearl, multiple new, earlier forms called Baby Pokémon were introduced, including Bonsly, which can evolve into Sudowoodo.

Its design was created by Sugimori unexpectedly whilst drawing various illustrations of characters. Following its creation, Sugimori asked a scenario writer to create backstory for the design about a Pokémon that blocks the player's path. Sudowoodo is a tree-like Pokémon featuring a brown body, beady eyes and an antannae-like protrusion from its head. The protrusion on its head will be a different size depending on its gender, being smaller for females compared to males. On the end of its arms are three green balls, which can vary in size. Its shiny form converts its body into an olive green color with dark magenta balls. Sudowoodo like to blend in and mimic trees. They are afraid of rain, and will flee when rain comes. It has strong limbs, allowing it to hold its arms up for long periods of time in order to mimic a tree. Sudowoodo are popular with the elderly, similarly to how bonsai are popular with them. Its Japanese name, Usokkī, comes from "uso," meaning "false," and "ki," meaning either "tree" or "wood." In English, the name "Sudowoodo" is a pun on "pseudo wood." Its name is German, Mogelbaum, translates to "cheating tree," while its name in French, "Simularbre," translates to "acts like a tree."

Sudowoodo has been voiced by different people depending on the media. Originally voiced by Keiji Fujiwara and Kiyotaka Furushima in the anime, it was later portrayed by Bill Rogers in Pokémon Journeys: The Series and Yuina in the short animation Pokétoon: The Pokémon Cartoon Animation. Tatsuki Kobe voiced it in Pokémon Horizons: The Series.

== Appearances ==
Sudowoodo originally appeared in Pokémon Gold and Silver. In these games, Sudowoodo appears as an obstacle, being mistaken for a tree by the player-character. It is only revealed to be a Pokémon once the player uses an item called a Squirt Bottle on it, causing it to attack. From this point, the player can defeat, capture, or flee from Sudowoodo; whichever action is taken, Sudowoodo will cease blocking the path. It is the only Sudowoodo that can be obtained in these games without trading. It is only available in Pokémon Ruby and Sapphire via trading. In the third version of these games, Pokémon Emerald, a single Sudowoodo appears at a location called the Battle Frontier. It appears in Pokémon Colosseum as a Shadow Pokémon that the protagonist can purify. Pokémon Diamond and Pearl adds a new baby form called Bonsly, only able to evolve once it learns the technique "Mimic". Sudowoodo is only able to be obtained in Pearl, where it was the first game where the Pokémon became widely available. It could also be found in the wild in Pokémon Platinum, the accompanying third version to Diamond and Pearl. It appears in Pokémon X and Y, sometimes appearing with a group of Trevenant, a Grass-type tree Pokémon. In Pokémon Scarlet and Violet, a Sudowoodo is featured as the ace of Gym Leader Brassius' Grass-type team. These games introduce a function called Terastallization, which allows a Pokémon to change type. This Sudowoodo will turn from Rock-type to Grass-type.

In Pokémon TCG Pocket, Sudowoodo was introduced in the Triumphant Light set of cards, labeled a Fighting-type Pokémon. The card has a single attack that does increased damage to EX Pokémon. In the Pokémon TV series, the character Brock obtains a Bonsly in the Pokémon: Battle Frontier season which eventually evolved into a Sudowoodo. It also appears in the season Pokémon the Series: Diamond and Pearl. Starting out as a crybaby as Bonsly, Sudowoodo becomes a powerful Pokémon of Brock's and one who strongly respects him.

== Critical reception ==
Sudowoodo has received generally positive reception, identified as an imaginative design by Rolling Stone. TheGamer writer Stacey Henley believed that Sudowoodo was a disliked Pokémon by many, stating that she was not able to understand why this is the case. She regarded it as one of her favorite Pokémon, believing that its name was the cleverest Pokémon species name, both for the pun on "pseudo wood" and for the name's rhythmic timbre. She also enjoyed its appearance in Gold and Silver, comparing its role to Snorlax as a fellow obstacle players had to overcome and stating that it had an "added surprise" due to its status as a Pokémon not being known before fighting it. She also commended the quality of its design and its mannerisms, speculating that the reason it may appear on so many worst designs lists is due to being well-known, leading it to being noticed more than worse Pokémon. As part of their "Pokémon of the Day" series, IGN staff commented on how "boring" a Pokémon it was despite finding his typing and appearance to be "unique"; however, its originality somewhat made up for this in their eyes.

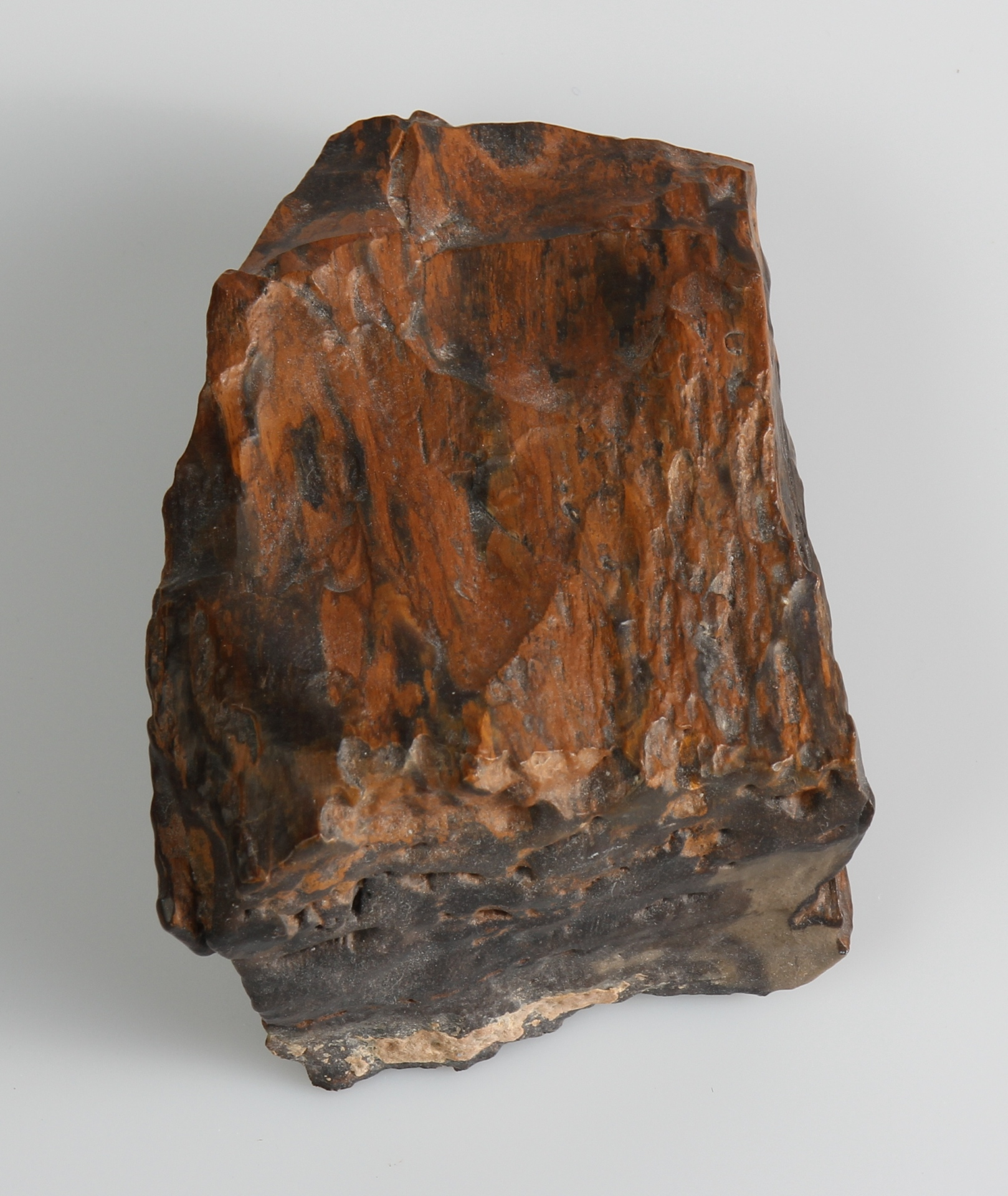
Petrified wood is believed to be the origin of Sudowoodo's Rock typing.

Kotaku writer Zack Zwiezen enjoyed the name and concept behind Sudowoodo, stating that he was confused to discover that it was a Rock-type Pokémon. He eventually discovered why it was named Sudowoodo, finding the etymology clever. Dot Esports writers Karli Iwamasa and Yash Nair regarded Sudowoodo as an iconic Pokémon, stating it was the "most iconic annoying Pokémon" due to serving as an obstacle for the player. They commented that trainers frequently felt confused that it was not weak to the same types of attacks as Grass-type Pokémon. In another article, Nair felt that Sudowoodo was the joke Pokémon of the second generation of Pokémon, stating that it was not intended to be a useful Pokémon and that they were fine with it just being a "rock disguised as a tree with a silly little face." They believed that, in its appearance in Pokémon HeartGold and SoulSilver, players will likely not be confused, arguing that they were used to seeing "rock types as things that weren’t rocks". Nair believed Sudowoodo represented the moment Game Freak made clear that Rock-type Pokémon didn't have to "look like a rock." The species appearance in Pokémon Sword and Shield was praised by Den of Geek writer Rob Leane who recommended it for players' teams due to its ability and moveset. Leane noted that Sudowoodos in the game were useful due to being able to withstand the attacks of Dynamax Pokémon because of its ability "Sturdy", which allows it to survive a strong attack but leaves the player's Pokémon with a single health point remaining. He further explained that by using the move Counter on the same turn can allow the Sudowoodo to deal high amounts of damage back at its opponent, with Leane describing the strategy as a lifesaver and able to create "some great 'David and Goliath' moments". Inside Games writer Cider identified Sudowoodo as the original misunderstood Pokémon, stating that while Sudowoodo has become a famous Pokémon, they believed many mistook it for a Grass-type Pokémon. Authors Weneson Victor Diniz Sarges and Lucas C. Marinho and discussed how Sudowoodo's concept of a Rock-type tree derives from real-world petrified trees, noting how these trees have, over time, become fossilized through the replacement of organic materials replaced with minerals; they added that its pre-evolution, Bonsly, was likely mimicking a bonsai tree.

In Pokémon TCG Pocket, Sudowoodo's card became an important one in competitive play, due in large part to the strength and popularity of the Arceus EX card that Sudowoodo was effective against due to a combination of Sudowoodo's enhanced damage against EX Pokémon, Arceus' weakness to Fighting-type Pokémon, and the speed by which the player can deploy and prep Sudowoodo to attack. GamesRadar+ writer Catherine Lewis expressing her appreciation for Sudowoodo's use and popularity. Following its popularity in the meta, fans created memes surrounding it.

Music producer Simon Ebener-Holscher named his band Moglebaum after the German name for Sudowoodo, Mogelbaum, commenting on how it is both "tricky and cunning" despite not being a powerful Pokémon and stating that he chose the name due to his interest in fantasy worlds. Vice writer Rachael D'Amore discussed how the sounds of Moglebaum's music fit well with the concept behind Sudowoodo, citing his use of field samples. The Italian band Pinguini Tattici Nucleari featured a song named "Sudowoodo" after the Pokémon in the album Diamo un calcio all'aldilà. Both the song title and lyrics were based on the "ambiguous" nature of the Pokémon, the band stating that it touches on themes of adolescence and the "cult of appearances." They also stated that they were "proud" of making the first song named after Sudowoodo. According to author Antonello Lopizzo, the song suggests Sudowoodo is victim to the "insensitivity" of Pokémon fans, misunderstood and miscategorized.
