= Snorlax =

Pokémon species

- Pokémon character
- Snorlax artwork by Ken Sugimori
- First game: Pokémon Red and Blue (Red and Green in Japan) (1996)
- Based on: Kōji Nishino
- Designed by: Ken Sugimori
- Voiced by: English: Michael Haigney; Eric Stuart; Japanese: Katsuyuki Konishi

In-universe information
- Species: Pokémon
- Type: Normal

Snorlax (/ˈsnɔːrlæks/), known in Japan as Kabigon (Japanese: カビゴン), is a Pokémon species in Nintendo and Game Freak's Pokémon franchise. Created by Ken Sugimori, Snorlax first appeared in the Game Boy video game Pokémon Red and Blue, and subsequent sequels, later appearing in various merchandise, spin-off titles, and animated and printed adaptations of the franchise, as well as the mascot of mobile game Pokémon Sleep. Snorlax is a large, blueish creature, notable for constantly sleeping. Snorlax is voiced by Michael Haigney and Eric Stuart in English, and Katsuyuki Konishi in Japanese.

Snorlax has received generally positive response since its debut, cited as one of the series' most recognizable characters and a staple of the Pokémon franchise due to its simple design. Its large size and lazy demeanor has led to it being described as "relatable", while others have praised its "cuddly" and merchandisable appearance, comparing it to a teddy bear.

== Conception and characteristics ==
Snorlax is a species of fictional creatures called Pokémon created for the Pokémon media franchise. Developed by Game Freak and published by Nintendo, the Japanese franchise began in 1996 with the video games Pokémon Red and Green for the Game Boy, which were later released in North America as Pokémon Red and Blue in 1998. In these games and their sequels, the player assumes the role of a Trainer whose goal is to capture and use the creatures' special abilities to combat other Pokémon. Some Pokémon can transform into stronger species through a process called evolution via various means, such as exposure to specific items. Each Pokémon has one or two elemental types, which define its advantages and disadvantages when battling other Pokémon. A major goal in each game is to complete the Pokédex, a comprehensive Pokémon encyclopedia, by capturing, evolving, and trading with other Trainers to obtain individuals from all Pokémon species.

"Kabiin," a Pokémon planned for Pokémon Red and Blue. It bears various naming and visual similarities to Snorlax, most notably in their resemblance to Nishino.

Designed by Ken Sugimori for the first generation of Pokémon games, the species was inspired in behavior and appearance by veteran Pokémon game designer Kōji Nishino. Nishino was exceptionally pleased by it, and in an interview with Famitsu stated Snorlax "is like my son!" According to Game Freak co-founder Junichi Masuda, Nishino had a habit of eating heavily then going to sleep. This behavior earned Nishino the nickname "Kirby" by Game Freak's staff as a nod to the Nintendo character, which in turn served as the basis for the Pokémon's Japanese name, "Kabigon". An earlier design, nicknamed "Kabiin," resembles an earlier version of Snorlax and bears similarities to Nishino. When translating the Pokémon games for western audiences, Nintendo decided to give the various Pokémon species "clever and descriptive names" related to their appearance or features to make the characters more relatable to American children. Basing the name off of the esquilax, a fictional rabbit creature from the Simpsons episode "Lisa's Wedding", localizer Bill Giese named the species in American releases Snorlax, a portmanteau of the words "snore" and "lax". Localizer Sara Bush, on the other hand, remembered the naming process differently, suggesting it was a combination of "lackadaisical" and "snore".

Snorlax is a highly sleepy Pokémon, known for constantly sleeping. Thanks to its extremely strong digestive juices, Snorlax's stomach can dissolve any kind of poison. As a result, it can eat tainted food without worry. Snorlax evolves from the Pokémon Munchlax, which is obtainable via breeding a Snorlax that is holding Full Incense, an in-game item. Munchlax also sports a voracious appetite, and evolves into a Snorlax when it has a sufficiently high level of friendship with its Trainer. Pokémon Sword and Shield introduced Snorlax's Gigantamax form. When Gigantamaxed, Snorlax grows significantly larger and changes appearance, with various trees and plants appearing on its belly, having grown from seeds that fell from the plants it had eaten. Snorlax was voiced by Michael Haigney and Eric Stuart in English, and by Katsuyuki Konishi in Japanese.

== Appearances ==
=== In video games ===
Snorlax's most notable role in the Pokémon games has been that of an inadvertent roadblock. In Pokémon Red, Blue, Yellow, and their remakes, the player must obtain the Poké Flute in order to wake up two Snorlax that block various routes in-game. Snorlax reprises this role in Pokémon Gold, Silver, their "upper version" and remakes. In these games, the player must play the radio's Poké Flute channel in front of Snorlax in order to awaken it. Although there is only one Snorlax available to catch, another is used by Red, the protagonist of Red and Blue who acts as these games' final boss. In Pokémon XD: Gale of Darkness, a pre-evolution of Snorlax named Munchlax was introduced; however, Munchlax remained unobtainable until the release of Pokémon Diamond and Pearl. In Pokémon Sun, Moon and their "upper versions", Snorlax is among the handful of Pokémon to possess a unique Z-Move, a powerful one-time use attack. It can use the move "Pulverizing Pancake" when holding a special "Snorlium Z" item. In Pokémon Sword and Shield, Snorlax gained a "Gigantamax form," which could be used in battle.

Snorlax appears in several spin-offs, such as PokéPark Wii: Pikachu's Adventure, Pokémon Go, Pokémon UNITE and New Pokémon Snap. In Pokémon Sleep, the player helps Snorlax by feeding it berries and meals throughout the day, and helping it fall asleep, boosting their "drowsy power" in the process. Snorlax also appears in the Super Smash Bros. series.

=== In other media ===
A notable Snorlax appears in the Pokémon anime, where series protagonist Ash Ketchum captures one. He uses it sporadically, due to its constant sleeping and eating habits, but it is a particularly strong battler, netting several major wins for Ash throughout the series. In the Pokémon Adventures manga, Red catches a Snorlax, which he nicknames "Snor". Red caught Snor because he was blocking the road during a bicycle race. Snorlax has since played a major role in his team. A Snorlax also appeared in the film Pokémon Detective Pikachu, sleeping on a road in Ryme City.

== Promotion and reception ==
A variety of merchandise depicting Snorlax has been produced such as cushions, beds, bean bag chairs, toys, and lounge chairs. In 2002, a contest was held to design a card for the Pokémon Trading Card Game, with Snorlax as the focus. Twenty entries were selected and posted to the Wizards of the Coast website, where the winner could be decided. Craig Turvey ended up winning the competition. Stickers featuring Snorlax were added to the Line messaging system in 2024. In 2023, "Project Snorlax" was announced, following similar campaigns for the Pokémon Eevee and Piplup, which promoted Snorlax in a variety of ways throughout the year. These included animated shorts, music videos, manga series, and special artwork for the Pokémon. A road in Las Vegas was named after Snorlax. Snorlax was a rare Pokémon in Pokémon Go, with sightings of the Pokémon in-game causing a stampede in Taiwan and New York City. Following earthquakes in Japan, Niantic boosted the spawn rates of Snorlax in Pokémon Go in affected prefectures in order to boost tourism in the area.

Snorlax has received generally positive reception from the media, and has been cited as one of the franchise' most recognizable characters. Nadine Manske of Dot eSports attributed their appeal to being "so relatable. Who doesn't want to just eat and sleep all day?" She further described it as having a "classic, simple design that makes it a lovable, staple Pokémon in every generation since the beginning." Ryan Woodrow for Sports Illustrated stated that one would be hard pressed to find anyone that hated Snorlax, also calling it a simple design but yet "such a lovable cuddly teddy bear that everyone who lays eyes on it falls in love with it." Alec Bojalad of Den of Geek called Snorlax "just a big cuddly critter" that was "eminently merchandisable", suggesting it would make a viable option as a mascot for the Pokémon franchise. Elijah Watson of Complex stated that while Snorlax was extremely lazy, they were also extremely powerful, despite their slow speed. He further added "We should all strive to be Snorlax: lazy as hell but surprisingly awesome." A video released for Project Snorlax, depicting Cubone and Snorlax—two normally solitary Pokémon—bonding received positive reviews from critics, with many highlighting it as heartwarming.

The book Media and the Make-believe Worlds of Children found that children could relate to Snorlax and interpret aspects of themselves in a positive light, describing it as an icon for a state of regression, but also symbolizing powerful characteristics for children. Scientific papers have also been published analyzing Snorlax as if they were real beasts, both in regards to their eating habits and to calculate the strength of their "Body Slam" attack.
