= Pokémon Adventures =

Japanese manga series

- Cover of the first tankōbon volume, featuring Red (front) and Pikachu (back)

ポケットモンスター SPECIAL (Poketto Monsutā Supesharu)
- Genre: Adventure, fantasy
- Manga
- Written by: Hidenori Kusaka
- Illustrated by: Mato (vol. 1–9); Satoshi Yamamoto (vol. 10–)
- Published by: Shogakukan
- English publisher: NA: Viz Media; SG: Shogakukan Asia
- Imprint: Tentōmushi Comics
- Magazine: Weekly CoroCoro Comic (web) (present, monthly updates); CoroCoro Ichiban!; Sunday Webry (web); Club Sunday (web) (former); Pokémon Fan; Pokémon Wonderland (former); Shogakukan's Separate Grade Learning Magazines (former)
- Original run: March 1997 – present
- Volumes: 64
- Manga parts
- 1. Red, Green & Blue (1997–1998); 2. Yellow (1998–1999); 3. Gold, Silver & Crystal (1999–2002); 4. Ruby & Sapphire (2002–2006); 5. FireRed & LeafGreen (2004–2007); 6. Emerald (2005–2008); 7. Diamond & Pearl (2006–2010); 8. Platinum (2009–2010); 9. HeartGold & SoulSilver (2010); 10. Black & White (2010–2013); 11. Black 2 & White 2 (2013–2020); 12. X & Y (2013–2016); 13. Omega Ruby & Alpha Sapphire (2014–2016); 14. Sun, Moon, Ultra Sun & Ultra Moon (2016–2019); 15. Sword & Shield (2019–2023); 16. Scarlet & Violet (2023–present)
- Side stories
- 1. W Mission Story: Pokémon Ranger the Comic (2006); 2. Darkrai Mission Story: Pokémon Ranger Vatonage the Comic (2008)
- icon

Pokémon Adventures (Japanese: ポケットモンスター SPECIAL, Hepburn: Poketto Monsutā Supesharu; lit. Pocket Monsters Special, commonly Pokespe (ポケスペ / ポケSP) for short) is a Japanese manga series based on the Pokémon media franchise. The series is written by Hidenori Kusaka. Mato was the illustrator for the first nine volumes. When Mato became ill and was unable to continue illustrating the series, Satoshi Yamamoto took over as the illustrator and still continues as the series' artist.

Satoshi Tajiri, the creator of Pokémon media franchise, once stated that the series is closest to how he imagined the universe of Pokémon to be.

Pokémon Adventures is translated into English in North America by Viz Media. As of May 2024, 63 volumes have been released, along with mini-volumes collecting arcs from "Black and White" onwards. In Southeast Asia, Singapore publisher Chuang Yi was translating Pokémon Adventures into English, and continued to translate new volumes up to volume 41. The company, however, entered voluntary liquidation in early 2014 and translation stopped. Shogakukan Asia now handles the series in Singapore.

== Plot ==
Pokémon Adventures is divided into several story arcs known as chapters, representing each mainline generation as well as their remakes and enhanced editions. 16 chapters have been released as of August 2023.

Due to the serialization of the Black 2 & White 2 chapter going on hold and taking many years before being collected into a volume, the X & Y and subsequent chapters of Pokémon Adventures were separately collected into mini-volumes. The rounds included in these mini-volumes were only ones that were published in the CoroCoro Ichiban magazine. Once the Black 2 & White 2 chapter ended in the regular volumes, the subsequent chapters started to be collected in that format as well.

=== Red, Green & Blue ===
The first story shows Red, the protagonist, who gets his Pokédex from Professor Oak to start on his Pokémon journey, collecting Pokémon and battling Gym Leaders for the eight coveted Gym Badges. He later meets his rival Blue (Note: Green in Japanese) who is Oak's own grandson. Later in his journey, he encounters con artist Green, (Note: Blue in Japanese) who sells him fake Pokémon items. She has stolen a Squirtle from Oak's lab and has evolved it into a Wartortle.

Later, Oak had been kidnapped by Team Rocket to replace Blaine, a former Team Rocket scientist, and the townspeople of Pallet Town were also kidnapped due to their strange empathy for Pokémon. Red, Green and Blue arrive at Saffron City to take on the Team Rocket Admins—Koga, Lt. Surge, and Sabrina. They manage to defeat Team Rocket and save Oak. It is revealed that using 7 Gym Badges, Articuno, Zapdos, and Moltres will be fused after Green does, unaware of the results. Their fusion results in a Pokémon referred to as Thu-Fi-Zer, which looks like the three Legendary Birds fused together at the body, having all three of their heads. Red, Green, and Blue then work together to defeat and split the bird apart. Red then travels to the Indigo Plateau to battle his rival Blue, having gained 7 Gym Badges, but also prevails against the bio-weapon Mewtwo and Team Rocket's leader and legendary missing Viridian Gym Leader, Giovanni, on the way. Green is confronted by Oak about stealing and is forgiven. Red later battles Blue in the Pokémon League Championships and emerges victorious, claiming the title of Pokémon League Champion.

=== Yellow ===
Red has disappeared after receiving a challenge letter sent to him by Bruno of the Elite Four. They plan to lure him to them, and use him to get information on Giovanni's whereabouts. They also need his Earth Badge. Only Red's Pikachu, Pika, managed to escape, Red having been encased in ice. Yellow decided to go look for Red, as Red had helped her catch a Rattata to train her in the skills of battling.

Later, Yellow, Blaine, Blue, Green, Bill, Lt. Surge, Koga and Sabrina join forces to bring down the Elite Four together. They find out that Lance's master plan was to use the Gym Badges and create an amplifying effect at Cerise Island to power up a mysterious Legendary Pokémon and destroy all humans in the world except themselves. They felt that humans and Pokémon were not meant to coexist. Red turned up later at Cerise Island to help Surge and Bill defeat Bruno. It is also revealed that Giovanni was the one who rescued Red from his ice coffin. Yellow battles Lance, but is losing until the other trainers send their power to Yellow, and with their combined strength, she manages to defeat Lance.

=== Gold, Silver & Crystal ===
The third adventure is based on the Pokémon Gold, Silver, and Crystal versions of the game. It features the protagonists Gold, Silver and Crystal, and is centered mostly around the Johto region. Gold first started his journey to chase a thief that broke into Professor Elm's lab, and stole a Totodile. Gold then made it his mission to get Totodile back from Silver (who stole it), and follows Silver. In Gold's quest to steal back Totodile, he decided to become fully involved in Silver's life. But following him gets him wrapped up in Neo Team Rocket (a revival of Team Rocket), and Gold tries to stop them. In a shocking reveal, it turns out one of the gym leaders is the Neo Team Rocket's leader, the Ice-type Gym Leader, Pryce. He was also the Mask of Ice, a mysterious man who kidnapped Silver and Green as children. The Johto Trio (Gold, Silver, and a pro catcher named Crystal) then stop both Neo Team Rocket and the Mask of Ice in a dramatic final battle to end off the chapter.

=== Ruby & Sapphire ===
The Ruby & Sapphire manga is based on the Ruby and Sapphire versions of the game. It features Ruby and Sapphire and their bet to each other: 80 days for Ruby to win all the Contest Ribbons in Hoenn, and for Sapphire, a powerful Trainer in her own right, to battle all the Gym Leaders for the 8 Gym Badges.

In their travels, they meet new companions like the Gym Leaders of the Hoenn region and the avid news reporter Gabby and her cameraman Ty (who play a minor role in the games). Team Aqua and Team Magma are introduced here, as they attempt to awaken the Legendary Pokémon Kyogre and Groudon to conquer the world, and Ruby and Sapphire take notice after encountering several main members in their journeys. The Gym Leaders, Ruby, and Sapphire end up trying to protect Hoenn from the awakened Kyogre and Groudon, their awakening causes a disaster as Ruby loses a contest, leading to his Feebas running away and unable to find its way back. Ruby, however, finds it and apologizes, and gives it the Hyper Rank Beauty Ribbon, after which it evolves into Milotic. In the chapter Rayquaza Redemption II, Sapphire confesses that she has developed romantic feelings for Ruby.

=== FireRed & LeafGreen ===
The next story, returning to Red, Green, and Blue, is loosely based on the Sevii Islands portion of the FireRed and LeafGreen versions of the game. The plot consists of Team Rocket trying to capture Deoxys, and Red, Green, and Blues' efforts to stop them. Along the way, they must rescue Green's parents and Professor Oak, who is Blue's grandfather, who have been kidnapped by Deoxys. Despite their best efforts, they are not able to stop Team Rocket from obtaining Deoxys, even though they've mastered the ultimate attacks taught by Ultima, an old but powerful woman residing on Two Island. After being defeated, Red is approached by Mewtwo who offers help in defeating Team Rocket.

Yellow and Silver are later reintroduced as they search for clues about Silver's parents. Knowing that his objective was somewhere in Viridian City, Silver met up with Yellow in the forest. Meanwhile, Giovanni used Deoxys's power to search for his lost son and was led to the Viridian Forest too. It is revealed that Silver is Giovanni's son and he passes out in shock. Yellow follows Team Rocket, who brought Silver back with them to an airship.

Red and Mewtwo challenge Giovanni. He loses, but the airship flies out of control. It is revealed that Red and Deoxys' have a connection because it absorbed some of Red's blood. Together, Red, Blue, Green, Yellow and Silver stop Deoxys from destroying the area, but they are caught in an energy clash that petrifies them. Though Mewtwo is also caught in the attack, his body is nowhere to be seen. Deoxys manages to escape moments before the blast and is currently searching for the other Deoxys that was disposed of after Team Rocket had no further use for it.

=== Emerald ===
The protagonist of this story arc is Emerald, who is hired by Crystal and Professor Oak to capture Jirachi in seven days before it is captured by Guile Hideout, the main antagonist of the arc. Emerald is also trying to challenge the seven facilities of the Battle Frontier and conquer them all. In the process, Emerald meets with the other two Hoenn Pokédex holders, Ruby and Sapphire.

The three Pokédex owners take on the Battle Frontier challenge, but they are interrupted by Guile Hideout, who was manipulating the head of the Battle Tower, Anabel. In an ensuing battle with Emerald, he releases Anabel from his control and reveals himself to be Team Aqua's leader, Archie. He also reveals that he has caught Jirachi, and subsequently uses it to summon a massive water-composed clone of Kyogre to flood the Battle Frontier. Archie hints that he is unable to be separated from the armor covering him for a prolonged period of time.

The three Pokédex holders escape the rising waters with the help of Gold and Crystal, who have also arrived at the Battle Frontier. Gold explains that the five Pokédex owners who were petrified – Red, Blue, Green, Yellow and Silver – were ordered to be shipped to the Battle Frontier. The hope was for them to be de-petrified through a wish to Jirachi. While Crystal trains Ruby and Sapphire to learn a powerful skill that can help stop Kyogre, Archie abandons Jirachi, who is subsequently left in Emerald's hands.

Gold assigns Emerald to make a wish to de-petrify Red, Blue, Green, Yellow and Silver. After finally coming into terms with his real desire—to be with Pokémon and people who like them, Jirachi grants his wish, and the five Pokédex owners are cured of their petrification. Red and Gold immediately incapacitate Archie by destroying his armor. With all ten Pokédex owners now reunited, they combine their strongest attacks together and defeat Kyogre and Archie, who vanishes for good.

=== Diamond & Pearl ===
This storyline is based on the Diamond and Pearl versions of the game. It features Lady Platinum Berlitz, who, for her coming-of-age ceremony, must travel to the top of Mt. Coronet in order to collect materials to create her own family emblem. Despite her vast knowledge, due to coming from a wealthy family of scholars, her father insists that she is followed by a pair of professional bodyguards. However, an identity mishap occurs as manzai comedians Diamond and Pearl believe that Platinum is their tour guide who will accompany them on a prize trip around Sinnoh, while Platinum believes that the duo are her bodyguards.

As they travel Sinnoh, Platinum becomes engrossed in Gym Battles after fighting Roark in order to up her Piplup's confidence. She manages to obtain six gym badges within a space of 25 days, which Byron remarks to have beaten Sapphire's previous record of 8 Gym Badges in 80 days. While helping Platinum prepare for Gym Battles through intense periods of training, the starter Pokémon bestowed upon them by Professor Rowan gradually evolve to their final evolved form, while Platinum's Ponyta evolves into a Rapidash.

In an encounter with Team Galactic while in Veilstone City, Platinum becomes Team Galactic's ransom target, as a means to extract capital to develop a bomb, which would be used to destroy the three lakes of Sinnoh. Platinum's center of attention causes the banishment of her real bodyguards to a different realm, causing Diamond and Pearl to continue faking as professional bodyguards, while now knowing the truth. The evidence is further solidified when the trio visit Celestic Town to find Cyrus studying the ruins there.

After battling Fantina for a Gym Badge, the trio learn that Platinum's father and Professor Rowan have been kidnapped while at an academic conference in Canalave City. They immediately speed to Canalave City aboard Fantina's Drifblim. After her father and Professor Rowan are saved, Platinum learns that Diamond and Pearl were not her bodyguards; while this causes a rift between them, Platinum reconciles with them by revealing her name as a means of declaring she recognizes the two as her friends. They resolve to continue their journey through Sinnoh in order to stop Team Galactic's nefarious plans and save the Legendary Pokémon (Mesprit, Uxie, and Azelf) of Sinnoh's three lakes. And Diamond, Pearl, and Platinum will be informed that Team Galactic captures the trio legendary Pokémon use them to the production of Red Chain in order to summon to the two legendary Pokémon in charge of time and space, Dialga and Palkia create a new universe.

=== Platinum ===
The chapter follows Lady Platinum Berlitz, separated from Diamond and Pearl, as she enters the Battle Frontier; as well as Looker, who is international police investigating information on the Team Galactic and assist Platinum investigating information on the Distortion World, where her original bodyguards, Dialga and Palkia, and Cyrus, Team Galactic's leader. To this end, Platinum will challenge the Frontier Brains to obtain intelligence.

At the same time, Charon of Team Galactic also initiate a plan of action to take possession of the Legendary Pokémon of Sinnoh, including the Legendary Pokémon expelled to Distortion World, Giratina.

=== HeartGold & SoulSilver ===
This arc is based on the Generation IV games, HeartGold and SoulSilver. Gold is tasked by Professor Oak to find former villain Lance in the Pokéathlon, as he holds information about the Alpha Pokémon, Arceus. Gold decides to compete in the Pokéathlon and wins the contests, but is unable to find Lance. Meanwhile, Silver discovers that Team Rocket has been resurrected once again, and is using 3 plates, items that greatly boost a Pokémon based on type, for another evil plot. Both events cause Gold, Silver, and Crystal to investigate the situation, eventually taking them to the Sinjoh Ruins, where the 4 executives behind Team Rocket plan to use Arceus, who has lost faith in humanity, to summon Dialga, Palkia, and Giratina to bring back their leader, Giovanni. The trio, helped by Giovanni, a reformed Lance, and Pryce (who has returned from the crack of time), defeat the Legendary Pokémon and restore Arceus' faith in humanity.

=== Black & White ===
This arc stars Black, a hot-headed boy with dreams of winning the Pokémon League in Unova with the ability to see the solution to a tough situation so long as he clears his mind of distractions. An accident at Professor Juniper's lab leaves him as the only one with a functioning Pokedex, and crashing a film set ends up with him under the employment of White, president of the BW Agency, which hires Pokémon actors. On their journey they are pursued by Team Plasma, who plan to liberate all Pokémon by manipulating others into giving them up, to the frustration of Black.

This was the first arc in the series to be published in "special edition" mini-volumes compiled from their magazine publications. 20 mini-volumes were published between July 2011 to February 2015, and nine tankōbon volumes were released between January 2013 to July 2014.

=== Black 2 & White 2 ===
The plot of Pokémon Black 2 and White 2 is a special class trip arc. It follows Blake (Lack-Two in Japan), a member of the International Police who seeks to arrest the seven sages and the other Black Team Plasma members, and Whitley (Whi-Two in Japan), a former member of Team Plasma yearning for the return of N. They are new students in Cheren's class along with Hugh, who vows himself to defeat Black Team Plasma and get the Purrloin they stole for his sister back. Black Team Plasma's plans now are to take over the Unova Region and awaken the Legendary Pokémon named Kyurem.

The serialization of the story arc began in July 2013. On September 27, 2016, it was announced that the chapter would be published digitally in Shogakukan's "Sunday Web Every". It began on October 4, 2016, and released each chapter of volume 52 on a weekly basis before continuing on to the first round of volume 53 on a monthly basis starting November 22, 2016. Another hiatus occurred following February 2018, but serialization resumed in March 2019 until its completion in April 2020. Its regular volumes publication began in December 2014 and concluded in May 2020.

=== X & Y ===
The X & Y chapter focuses on a depressed boy named X, who won a major tournament as a child, and Y (full name Yvonne Gabena), a girl who dreams of becoming a Sky Trainer. X has been forced out of hiding when two Legendary Pokémon, Xerneas and Yveltal blow up his town. Soon, he meets up with a group called Team Flare who tries to steal his tool that enables Mega Evolution. X, Y, and their companions, Shauna, Tierno, and Trevor have to try to escape Team Flare by seeking a place where they can go in peace; however, the plan does not go like X, Y and friends want.

Serialization of this story arc began in October 2013 and concluded in November 2016. The publication of the X & Y chapter in the regular volume format began in May 2020 and concluded in February 2022.

=== Omega Ruby & Alpha Sapphire ===
The Omega Ruby & Alpha Sapphire arc focuses on the returning Hoenn trio of Ruby, Sapphire, and Emerald, based on the Omega Ruby and Alpha Sapphire versions of the game. Ruby, Sapphire, and Emerald acquire Mega Bracelets and Mega Stones from Steven to help aid his quest to save the Earth from impending doom by a meteorite while Ruby encounters a mysterious girl along the way. Sapphire is traumatized when she learns the truth about the meteor, and because of that trauma she loses her voice and sense of smell. Ruby takes on the role of lorekeeper and gets Rayquaza to trust him so they can save the world. It is based primarily on the events of the Delta Episode in the games.

The arc was released digitally on Shogakukan's "Web Sunday", with a new chapter on the first Tuesday of every month. The first mini-volume was released in Japan on July 24, 2015.

=== Sun, Moon, Ultra Sun & Ultra Moon ===
This chapter features a boy named Sun who is a courier with the hope of gathering 100 million yen (dollars in the Viz Media English translation) and a girl named Moon who is a pharmacist and an archer. In order to calm the wrath of the Tapu, one of which unexpectedly attacked them, the guardian deities of Alola, they embarked on an island challenge journey, and will face Team Skull and the Aether Foundation's Ultra Beast-related conspiracy, the mysterious creatures come from the alternate dimension Ultra Space.

=== Sword & Shield ===
Marvin is a young boy who just moved to Galar Region and met Henry Sword (Sōdo Tsurugi in Japan) and Casey Shield (Shieldmilia Tate in Japan). Henry is a "Meister" of repair Pokémon's gear and hopes to have an opportunity to see the Legendary artifacts Rusted Sword and Shield, while Casey is a computer engineer who is interested in Dynamax and looking for her lost Pokémon team. They traveled with Professor Magnolia to help her investigate the Dynamax phenomenon. Henry and Casey plan to challenge the Pokémon League in Galar, in order to gather information about Casey's lost Pokémon.

=== Scarlet & Violet ===
This chapter follows Violet Lang, the self-proclaimed 'Prince of Speed', who accompanies Arven on the search for the Herba Mystica with his Miraidon, and Scarlet Koito, an orphaned treasure hunter with ties to Team Star, who, with Nemona, seeks to battle the Gym Leaders of the Paldea region.

== Characters ==
A collage of the series main characters up through the Emerald installment. Clockwise: Emerald (center), Yellow (Top Center), Red, Gold, Ruby, Blue, Silver, Sapphire, Green, and Crys

The protagonists of the series are mainly the Pokémon Trainers called Pokédex Holders that are recognized by the well-known Pokémon professors in various regions and awarded Pokédex.

As of Scarlet and Violet chapter, there are 25 Pokédex Holders.

=== Kanto ===
- Red – The male protagonist in the Red, Green & Blue and FireRed & LeafGreen chapters and the first protagonist in the series. The champion of the 9th Indigo Plateau Pokémon League. Initially shown as a rash young trainer, he has matured over the course of the series. His first Pokémon was a Poliwag, which is first seen as a Poliwhirl. It later evolves into Poliwrath to save Red from drowning. When he started his journey, he received a Bulbasaur from Professor Oak. It eventually evolved to a Venusaur, but he temporarily traded it with his rival Blue for a Charizard in FireRed and LeafGreen, though they traded back at the end of the saga. His Pokémon are Poliwrath (Poli), Venusaur (Saur), Pikachu (Pika), Snorlax (Snor), Espeon (Vee), Gyarados (Gyara) and Aerodactyl (Aero). He specializes in Pokémon Battles (Fighter). In his latest appearance in the Omega Ruby & Alpha Sapphire arc, he is twenty years old.
- Blue – The secondary male protagonist in the Red, Green & Blue and FireRed & LeafGreen chapters. As the cool-headed yet somewhat cocky rival of Red; their relationship has improved over the course of the series. He had the starter Pokémon Charmander, now a Charizard. He excels at training Pokémon (Trainer), even those that are not his. His team as of the FRLG saga consists of Charizard, Golduck, Machamp, Rhyperior, Porygon2, and Scizor. He has been made gym leader of Viridian City after Red declined that offer. Although the exact timing of his appearance in the XY chapter is unknown, it is probable that it occurs simultaneously with the ORAS chapter, making him twenty.
- Green – The female protagonist in the Red, Green & Blue and FireRed & LeafGreen chapters. A crafty and perky pickpocket who stole a Squirtle from Professor Oak. She made her first appearance by persuading Red into buying fake items by using her beauty. Now, she is one of Red's closest friends. It was revealed that when she was young, she was one of the Masked Children along with Johto dex holder Silver. Her Squirtle has since evolved into a Blastoise. She excels at evolving Pokémon (Evolver). Her current team comprises Blastoise (Blasty), Wigglytuff (Jiggly), Clefable (Clefy), Granbull, Nidoqueen (Nido), and Ditto (Ditty). She used to have ornithophobia before overcoming it by capturing Articuno, Zapdos, and Moltres. As of her latest appearance in the Omega Ruby & Alpha Sapphire arc, she is twenty.
- Yellow – The protagonist in the Yellow chapter. She is happy-go-lucky, gentle, and kind-hearted. Yellow has a rare psychic power to heal Pokémon (Healer), a trait seen only in special individuals from the Viridian Forest area. She disguised herself as a boy on a mission to save Red. She also has many other psychic abilities, such as telekinesis and mind reading through her Will of the Forest ability. She has narcolepsy, which is often triggered by use of her abilities. During her adventures in the Yellow arc,, she borrowed Red's Pikachu, Pika. She now has her own Pikachu, a female named Chuchu. Her current team consists of Pikachu (Chuchu), Golem (Gravvy), Omastar (Omny), Dodrio (Dody), Butterfree (Kitty), and Raticate (Ratty).

=== Johto ===
- Gold – The male protagonist in the Gold, Silver & Crystal and HeartGold & SoulSilver chapters. He is the good-hearted, but somewhat loud-mouthed, protagonist of the Gold & Silver saga. He is very rash, even more so than Red. He specializes in hatching Pokémon (Breeder). His current team consists of Typhlosion (Exbo), Ambipom (Aibo), Mantine (Tibo), Politoed (Polibo), Sudowoodo (Sudobo), Sunflora (Sunbo), Togekiss (Togebo), and Pichu (Pibu), who was given to him by Yellow as a result of her and Red's Pikachu's courtship. His first adventure started in the Gold, Silver & Crystal arc thinking Silver stole his backpack full of Pokémon. In the HeartGold & SoulSIlver arc he is sixteen years old.
- Silver – The secondary male protagonist in the Gold, Silver & Crystal and HeartGold & SoulSilver chapters. Gold's blunt yet kind rival, the son of Team Rocket leader Giovanni. Was a Masked Child until he escaped alongside his sister figure, Green. He had the starter Pokémon Totodile (stolen, like Green's Squirtle), now a Feraligatr. He specializes in trading Pokémon (Exchanger). His team consists of Feraligatr, Weavile, Kingdra, Honchkrow, and the red Gyarados from the Lake of Rage. In the HeartGold & SoulSIlver arc he is sixteen years old.
- Crystal (Crys/Kris) – The female protagonist in the Gold, Silver & Crystal and HeartGold & SoulSilver chapters. An intelligent and energetic expert at catching Pokémon (Capturer), she has caught every non-legendary Pokémon for Professor Oak (she got the legendary Pokémon's data with the help of the 1st generation trainers). She had a Chikorita for a starter Pokémon, which is now a Meganium. Currently, she owns Meganium (Megaree), Xatu (Xatee), Hitmonchan (Monlee), Smoochum (Chumee), Arcanine (Archy), Parasect (Parasee), Mr. Mime (Mymee), and Cubone (Bonee). In the HeartGold & SoulSIlver arc she is sixteen years old.

=== Hoenn ===
- Ruby – The male protagonist in the Ruby & Sapphire and Omega Ruby & Alpha Sapphire chapters. The protagonist of the fourth chapter, and Gym Leader Norman's son, as well as Sapphire's rival. He hates Pokémon battles and prefers to compete in Pokémon Contests, as a result of what had happened to him and Sapphire when they were young. He was able to win every Contest, gaining the title of Charmer. Ruby received the starter Pokémon Mudkip, which evolves into a Swampert. His party last checked consists of Swampert (Mumu), Mightyena (Nana), Delcatty (Kiki), Castform (Fofo), Milotic (Feefee) and Gardevoir (Rara). He previously had Celebi.
- Sapphire – The female protagonist in the Ruby & Sapphire and Omega Ruby & Alpha Sapphire chapters. Daughter of Professor Birch and Ruby's rival. She is very wild and often dresses in clothes made of leaves. She loves battling and thinks Pokémon Coordinators (like Ruby) are prissy, as a result of what had happened to her and Ruby when they were young. She was able to defeat every Gym Leader, earning the title of Conqueror. She had Torchic for a starter Pokémon, which evolves into a Blaziken. Her party currently consists of Blaziken (Chic), Aggron (Rono), Wailord (Lorry), Donphan (Phado), Tropius (Troppy), Gallade (Kirly) and Relicanth (Relly).
- Emerald – The main protagonist in the Emerald chapter and the other male protagonist in Omega Ruby & Alpha Sapphire chapter. He initially did not have any Pokémon, but later was joined by a Sudowoodo and Dusclops. He also carries a concealed gun known as an E-Shooter as a tool to calm Pokémon. Emerald was hired by Crystal to compete in the Battle Frontier to protect the legendary Pokémon Jirachi from an evil man named Guile Hideout. For his skill in calming down rampaging Pokémon, he gained the title of Calmer. Emerald also stole a Sceptile from the Battle Factory, which was none other than the same Grovyle which was blown away from Sky Pillar while awakening Rayquaza. Emerald uses Pokémon that Crystal owns in each attraction, excluding the Battle Factory, Battle Tower, Battle Palace, and Battle Arena. He has a connection to the legendary Pokémon Latios and Latias. Emerald's party last checked consists of Sceptile, Dusclops, Sudowoodo, Snorlax, Mr. Mime and Mantine.

=== Sinnoh ===
- Diamond – The male protagonist in the Diamond & Pearl and Platinum chapters. An aspiring comedian with a gluttonous and laid-back personality, though one who has been shown to sometimes exhibit charisma and insight in desperate situations (Empathizer). Is kind to everyone, quick to make friends, and has a very powerful moral code. He is a Pokémon trainer and a very good friend of Pearl. He has a Bastiodon (Don), Lickilicky (Kit), Munchlax (Lax), and Torterra (Tru). He also owns a Mamoswine (Moo) that was given to him by Platinum, and has the legendary Regigigas (Reg). Because of a mix-up, he initially thinks that if he escorts Berlitz to Mt. Coronet he will win a prize, but alongside Pearl he decides to accompany her anyway after the truth is revealed. During the journey, he develops a strong friendship with Platinum.
- Pearl – The other male protagonist in the Diamond & Pearl and Platinum chapters. A headstrong boy with a hasty personality and a dream of becoming a great comedian, Pearl is never afraid to speak his mind. He has the ability to determine the move a Pokémon is about to use (Determiner). He is a comedian, like his partner Diamond, and has a Chatot (Chatler), Luxray (Rayler), Infernape (Chimler), Buizel (Zeller), Tauros (Tauler), and Diglett (Digler). Because of a mix-up, he initially thinks that if he escorts Berlitz to Mt. Coronet, he will win a prize. Though suspicious of her at first, Pearl grows to respect Platinum for her many talents.
- Platinum Berlitz – The female protagonist in the Diamond & Pearl and Platinum chapters, and also the main protagonist overall of both chapters. The elegant but spoiled main protagonist and only child of a very wealthy and important family, she has to travel to Mt. Coronet as part of a family ritual, which is to gather the materials needed to make a special emblem of her family crest. She is an avid reader, and hopes to be able to put her knowledge into practice (Understander). She receives three Pokédexes, three Pokétches, and the three starters (Turtwig, Chimchar, and Piplup) from Professor Rowan to give to her partners. She owns an Empoleon, Rapidash, and Lopunny. She was also given a Froslass, Cherrim and Pachirisu by Candice, Gardenia and Maylene (although the Pachirisu actually belonged to Volkner). Throughout the early portions of the story, her first name is omitted and not revealed, being only referred to as "Lady" (Ojou-sama) or 'Missy' in the Chuang Yi translation; later, her name is revealed as Platinum. She is known to enter many competitions, such as Pokémon Super Contests, gym leader battles, and Sinnoh Battle Frontier.

=== Unova ===
- Black – The male protagonist in the Black & White chapter. He owns a male Tepig, and his quest is to be a master trainer. Black meets White in an accident with a Galvantula busting one of White's gigs. He can be very perceptive, but his dream of winning the Pokémon League fills his mind so much that he cannot think properly (Dreamer). When this happens his Munna (Musha) eats his dreams so he can think clearly, like a detective. His current party consists of Braviary (Brav), Musharna (Musha), Emboar (Bo), Galvantula (Tula), Carracosta (Costa) and possibly Reshiram.
- White – The female protagonist the in Black & White chapter. She is the owner of a Pokémon talent agency, which rents out Pokémon actors to movies and ads (Dreamer). She owned a female Tepig (Gigi), but when it left her for N, she received N's Servine, who she names Amanda. Amanda later evolves into Serperior, and White also obtains a Deerling (Darlene), Stunfisk (Dorothy), Alomomola (Nancy), Duosion (Solly), and Vullaby (Barbara). Gigi eventually decided to come back to her agency.
- Blake (known as Lack-Two in Japan) – The male protagonist in the Black 2 & White 2 chapter. He is a member of the International Police in search for Black Team Plasma's members (Arrester). He is shown owning a Dewott, Keldeo (Kelden), Genesect, Kabutops (Kabutott), an Escavalier and Gliscor (Glisott).
- Whitley (known as Whi-Two in Japan) – The female protagonist in the Black 2 & White 2 chapter. She is a former member of Team Plasma with her mother. She believes former Team Plasma is good, and N will return to lead them (Liberator). She is shown having a Foongus (Foongy), an Accelgor and a Delphox.

=== Kalos ===
- X – The male protagonist in the X & Y chapter. A boy who won a Pokémon Tournament when he was younger but became overwhelmed by paparazzi and became a depressed shut-in (Loner). He owns a Kangaskhan (Kanga and Li'l Kanga), Charizard (Salamè), Manectric (Élec), Gengar (Garma), and Pinsir (Rute) that can all Mega Evolve. He also has a Chesnaught nicknamed Marisso.
- Y – The female protagonist in the X & Y chapter. A girl who dreams of becoming a Sky Trainer although her mother is a popular Rhyhorn racer (Flyer), her full name is Yvonne Gabena. She has an intrepid personality and is a leader in the Vaniville friends group. She is shown with a Fletchinder (Fletchy), Sylveon (Veevee), Greninja (Croaky), Rhyhorn (Rhyrhy), Absol (Solsol that can Mega Evolve), and Xerneas (Xerxer) although Xerxer was eventually lost when it turned back into its tree form during the final battle.

=== Alola ===
- Sun – The male protagonist in the Sun & Moon and Ultra Sun & Ultra Moon chapters. A money obsessed boy from Kanto with many jobs, mainly as a delivery boy. His goal is to collect 100 million yen to buy back an island the Aether Foundation stole from his great-grandfather (Saver). He has his great-grandfather's Alolan Meowth (Cent), an Incineroar (Dollar), a Totem Wishiwashi (Quarter), a Totem Mimikyu (Penny), a Crabominable (Loot) and a Stakataka (Drachma).
- Moon – The female protagonist in the Sun & Moon and Ultra Sun & Ultra Moon chapters. A girl from Sinnoh who is skilled at archery, and is a pharmacist (Mixer). She came to Alola to find materials to cure a Piplup that she accidentally poisoned. She is currently shown with a Charjabug, Mareanie, Alolan Muk, and Decidueye. She is hinted to be related to Platinum.

=== Galar ===
- Henry (known as Soudo/Sword in Japan) – The male protagonist in the Sword & Shield chapter. Full name known as Henry Sword Soudo Tsurugi (剣 創人, Tsurugi Sōdo), he is a "Meister" (身具職人, Shingu Meister) who repairs the gear Pokémon use in battle and in life. When working on gear, he hyperfocuses, but otherwise he seems laidback- if a tad manipulative. Feels responsible for Casey losing her Pokémon and is going through the Pokémon League challenge to help her find them. Has a Rillaboom (Twiggy), Sirfetch'd (Lancelot), Gurdurr (Steeler), Oranguru (Fanguru) and Mr. Rime (Kayne) named after their gear, and also a Rapid Strike Urshifu (Āman).
- Casey (known as Shieldmilia in Japan) – The female protagonist in the Sword & Shield chapter. Her full name is Casey Shield (Shieldmilia Tate (盾 シルドミリア)), is a loud, energetic girl and a technological prodigy. She has a very analytic mind and loves Dynamaxing and pranks. In the past, she had an accident where she lost all five of her Pokémon. With the help of Henry, Professor Magnolia, and Marvin, she hopes to challenge the Pokémon League to gain press attention and use it to search for her team. Her starter Pokémon is a Scorbunny (now a Cinderace nicknamed Bit), but as the chapter progresses, she recovers her lost party: Falinks (Giga), Galarian Stunfisk (Mega), Low Key Toxtricity (Tera), Eiscue (Peta) and Arrokuda (Kilo).

=== Paldea ===
- Violet – The male protagonist in the Scarlet & Violet chapter, full name Violet Lang. Calling himself "the Prince of Speed" and accompanied by Miraidon and a Rotom Phone butler called Old Roto, he expects everyone around him to refer to him as 'Prince' and 'Your Highness'. In spite of that, he ironically is also quick to make friends with others, to Arven's disgust. In order to become the fastest person in Paldea with Miraidon, he is searching for Herba Mystica with Arven. His other Pokemon is Fuecoco, later evolved into Crocalor, Nymble, evolved into Lokix, a Paldean Wooper, evolved into Clodsire, a Smoliv, evolved into Dolliv and Cyclizar.
- Scarlet – The female protagonist in the Scarlet & Violet chapter, full name Scarlet Koito. A lone wolf treasure hunter, who was orphaned and homeless at a very young age. She is searching for Pokémon known as the Treasures of Ruin after a task set from an anonymous client (who later turns out to be Uva Academy teacher Ms Raifort). Her Pokemon is Sprigatito, later evolved into Floragato, Tarountula, Pikachu, Palafin and Charcadet, which evolves into Armarouge. She is also hinted to be affiliated with Team Star, who took care of her prior to the events of the story arc.

== Development ==
Series writer Hidenori Kusaka was offered to make a Pokémon manga by Nintendo. Having been a fan of manga ever since he was a child, Kusaka quickly accepted. The serialization of the manga began in Shogakukan's 4th grade Elementary School magazine in March 1997, and since then, it has been serialized through other Shogakukan's magazines and platforms, including CoroCoro Ichiban!, Sunday Webry and Pokémon Fan. When writing the series, Kusaka always tries to add elements of amazements with the idea that the readers would feel they are actually playing a video game. Some parts from the story are based on Kusaka's thoughts of the Pokémon video games, which includes weapon designs and the areas where wild Pokémon live. His main focus in manga is to create Pokémon that look attractive so that readers would appreciate them more. He also tries to balance the number of Pokémon trainers and Pokémon in order to be faithful to the game.

During publication of the series, artist Mato fell sick leaving Kusaka to either cancel the series or select another artist. He decided to continue and chose Satoshi Yamamoto as Mato's replacement. Yamamoto felt pressure during his debut as older fans criticized his art in comparison to Mato. When he started drawing he had little knowledge about Pokémon, but still he was focused in the drawing for the new protagonist, Crystal. After working for a year, he was surprised with Kusaka's stories and wanted to make his pictures give a good impression. During the fourth story arc, Yamamoto mentioned that several of the disasters happening in the Hoenn region that he drew are based on his favorite horror and monster movies.

== Reception ==
Japanese volumes from the series have been featured in the Japanese comic ranking various times. Viz's first volumes edition from the manga, "The Best of Pokémon Adventures", appeared on ICv2's Top 20 Graphic Novels from April 2008. It also won the first Nickelodeon Magazine Comics Awards in the category "Favorite Manga Series". Readers from Media Factory's Da Vinci Denshi Navi magazine voted the series as the third manga they wanted to have an animated adaptation. By September 2014, the manga had over 12 million copies in circulation only in Japan. Southeast Asia publisher Shogakukan Asia announced in November 2016 that the manga had sold over 150 million copies worldwide. However, in December 2017, the illustrator Satoshi Yamamoto stated on his Twitter account that this was an error. By August 2017, it had 28 million copies in circulation worldwide.

ICv2's Nick Smith gave the first volume 3.5 stars out of 5, commenting that several of the parts from the manga make it more interesting than the anime, such as Team Rocket's appearances or Pikachu's rebelled personality. Although he still noted there was more violence in the manga than in the anime, he still recommended it for all ages.

Volume 14 charted at tenth on The New York Times Manga Best Seller list on the week ending August 6, 2011.

Tsunekazu Ishihara, CEO of The Pokémon Company, said "I want every Pokémon fan to read this comic!"
