= Hidenori Kuramoto =

Japanese baseball player (born 1976)

Hidenori Kuramoto 英智
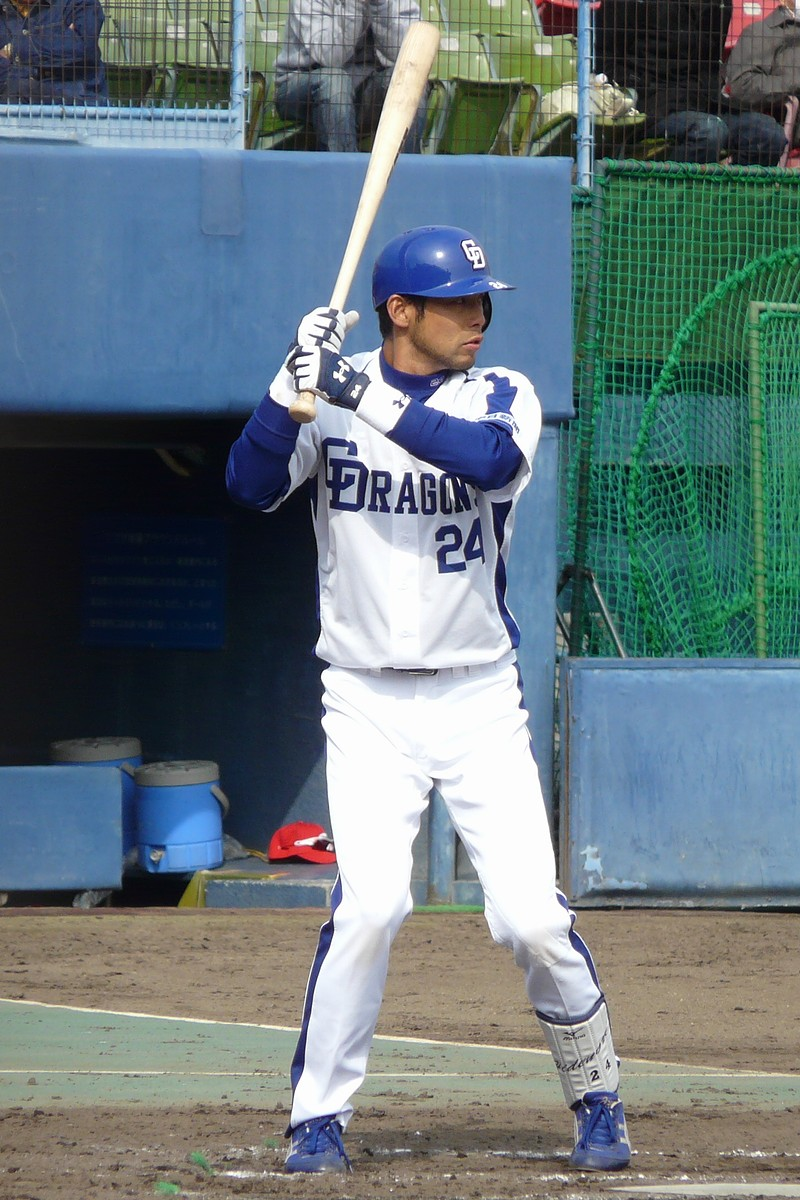
- Coach
- Born: May 9, 1976 (age 50)
- Bats: Right Throws: Right

NPB debut
- 2001, for the Chunichi Dragons

NPB statistics (through 2012)
- Batting average: .236
- Home runs: 11
- RBI: 115
- Stats at Baseball Reference

Teams
- As player: Chunichi Dragons (2001–2012); As coach: Chunichi Dragons (2013–2022)

Hidenori Kuramoto (蔵本 英智, Kuramoto Hidenori; born May 9, 1976) also known as Hidenori (英智) is a Japanese former professional baseball outfielder for the Chunichi Dragons in Japan's Nippon Professional Baseball. Hidenori played for the Dragons from 2001 to 2012. He is currently employed with the Dragons as the second team outfield and base-running coach.
