= Lists about Pokémon =

The following is a list of Pokémon-related lists who appear in various games and franchises published by Nintendo arranged in alphabetical order.

== Pokémon species ==
1. List of generation I Pokémon
2. List of generation II Pokémon
3. List of generation III Pokémon
4. List of generation IV Pokémon
5. List of generation V Pokémon
6. List of generation VI Pokémon
7. List of generation VII Pokémon
8. List of generation VIII Pokémon
9. List of generation IX Pokémon

== Characters ==
- List of Pokémon rivals

== Media ==
- List of Pokémon episodes
  - List of Pokémon episodes (seasons 1–9)
  - List of Pokémon episodes (seasons 10–19)
  - List of Pokémon episodes (seasons 20–present)
- List of Pokémon films
- List of Pokémon manga
  - List of Pokémon volumes
    - List of Pokémon Adventures volumes
    - List of Pokémon Adventures volumes (1–20)
    - List of Pokémon Adventures volumes (21–40)
    - List of Pokémon Adventures volumes (41–current)
- List of Pokémon theme songs

== Gaming ==
- List of Pokémon Trading Card Game sets
- List of Pokémon video games
