= List of Pokémon Adventures volumes (21–40) =

Pokémon Adventures, known in Japan as Pocket Monsters Special (ポケットモンスター SPECIAL, Poketto Monsutā SPECIAL), is a Japanese manga series published by Shogakukan. The story arcs of the series are based on most of the Pokémon video games released by Nintendo and, as such, the main characters of the series have the name of their video game. Since the manga is based on the video games, there are some delays with the serialization since the authors need to have seen the games in order to continue with the plot.

The series is written by Hidenori Kusaka, it is illustrated by Mato during the first nine volumes, while Satoshi Yamamoto starts illustrating it since the tenth volume. The Japanese publisher Shogakukan has been releasing the individual chapters in tankōbon format with the first one being released on August 8, 1997, and currently, 64 tankōbon have been released.

The distributing company Viz Media has licensed the series for English in the United States. Viz released the first seven volumes of the series in tankōbon format from July 6, 2000 to January 2003 as well as in magazine format. During 2006 they released two volumes with the name of The Best of Pokémon Adventures which are various chapters from the first two arcs put into one book. On June 1, 2009, Viz restarted publishing the tankōbon volumes, and are now up to volume 9 as of October 2010. Volume 10 is scheduled for December 2010, and volumes 11, 12 and volume 30 of the DP arc (known as volume 1 of Platinum in Viz's release) are all scheduled for 2011 as well. However, these releases feature both visual and dialogue edits not found in the original English release and original Japanese tankobon release.

== Volume list ==
=== Volumes 21–40 ===
==== Ruby & Sapphire chapter ====
No.	Title	Original release date	English release date
21	I Want to Let Him Know; I Want to Tell Him (あの人に伝えたい)	December 24, 2005; 4-09-140096-5	March 4, 2014; 978-1-4215-3555-5
250. "The Beginning of the End with Kyogre & Groudon XII" (VSカイオーガ&グラードンXII: チャンピオン帰還, VS Kaiōga & Gurādon XII: Champion Kikan; "VS Kyogre & Groudon XII: The Champion Returns"); 251. "The Beginning of the End with Kyogre & Groudon XIII" (VSカイオーガ&グラードンXIII: このマントを托す, VS Kaiōga & Gurādon XIII: Kono Manto o Takusu; "VS Kyogre & Groudon XIII: Take the Cloak"); 252. "The Beginning of the End with Kyogre & Groudon XIV" (VSカイオーガ&グラードンXIV: 大切なあの人, VS Kaiōga & Gurādon XIV: Taisetsu na ano Hito; "VS Kyogre & Groudon XIV: That Important Person"); 253. "A Royal Rumble with Regirock, Regice and Registeel I" (VSレジロック,レジアイス&レジスチルI: 結びつくメッセージ, VS Rejirokku, Rejiaisu & Rejisuchiru I: Musubitsuku Message; "VS Regirock, Regice & Registeel I: Joined Message"); 254. "A Royal Rumble with Regirock, Regice and Registeel II" (VSレジロック,レジアイス&レジスチルII: 刻まれた隊列, VS Rejirokku, Rejiaisu & Rejisuchiru II: Kizama re ta Tairetsu; "VS Regirock, Regice & Registeel II: Old Engravings"); 255. "With a Spoink in Your Step I" (VSバネブーI: 幻の島, VS Binaboo I: Maboroshi no Shima; "VS Binaboo I: Mirage Island"); 256. "With a Spoink in Your Step II" (VSバネブーII: 最後の大特訓, VS Binaboo II: Saigo no dai Tokkun; "VS Binaboo II: The Final Training"); 257. "The Beginning of the End with Kyogre & Groudon XV" (VSカイオーガ&グラードンXV: 宝珠が求むるもの, VS Kaiōga & Gurādon XV: Houshu ga Motomu ru Mono; "VS Kyogre & Groudon XV: What the Jewels Seek"); 258. "Rayquaza Redemption I" (VSレックウザI: 裂空の覚醒者, VS Rekkuuza I: Retsu Sora no Kakusei Sha; "VS Rayquaza I: Rude Awakening"); 259. "Rayquaza Redemption II" (VSレックウザII: 戦渦の告白, VS Rekkuuza II: Senka no Kokuhaku; "VS Rayquaza II: Confession During Battle")
Kyogre and Groudon start its battle with the former representing the sea Pokémon and the latter the ones from the surface. In order to prevent them from causing more destruction, Steven comes with his teammates, Hoenn's Elite Four, to stop them. Using Sapphire's message, he summons the trio Regis - Registeel, Regirock, and Regice, which sends to fight the berserker Ancient Pokémon. Ruby and Sapphire are then transported to Mirage Island where Wallace's father, Juan, and the two remaining Gym Leaders, Tate and Liza, start training them to control Kyogre and Groudon. During the practice, Ruby and Sapphire learn to absorbed the orbs from its previous owners. Once ending the training, Sapphire reveals she fell for Ruby with the two remembering they were friends as infants. Sharing the same feelings for Sapphire, Ruby departs with Courtney to stop Kyogre and Groudon afraid of Sapphire's fate. Meanwhile, with Wally's help, Norman awakes the third Ancient Pokémon - Rayquaza, and heads to Ruby's side.
22	Land, Sea and Sky; Land, Sea and Sky (陸と海と天空と)	August 28, 2006; 4-09-140228-3	May 6, 2014; 978-1-4215-3556-2
260. "It All Ends Now I" (最終超決戦I: 冒険のレコード, Saishū Chō Kessen I: Bouken no Rekōdo; "The Final Showdown I: Adventure Records"); 261. "It All Ends Now II" (最終超決戦II: 海と陸と天空と, Saishū Chō Kessen II: Umi to Riku to Tenkuu to; "The Final Showdown II: Land, Sea and Sky"); 262. "It All Ends Now III" (最終超決戦III: 届け フーセンガム, Saishū Chō Kessen III: Todoke fūsengamu; "The Final Showdown III: Go to Him, Bubble Balloon"); 263. "It All Ends Now IV" (最終超決戦IV: 粛正の咆吼, Saishū Chō Kessen IV: Shukusei no Houkou; "The Final Showdown IV: Roar that Subdues"); 264. "It All Ends Now V" (最終超決戦V: 罪と罰, Saishū Chō Kessen V: Tsumi to Ba; "The Final Showdown V: Crime and Punishment"); 265. "It All Ends Now VI" (最終超決戦VI: 究極の結論, Saishū Chō Kessen VI: Kyuukyou no Ketsuron; "The Final Showdown VI: The Ultimate End"); 266. "It All Ends Now VII" (最終超決戦VII: はじめての捕獲, Saishū Chō Kessen VII: Hajimete no Hokaku; "The Final Showdown VII: Beautiful Heart"); 267. "It All Ends Now VIII" (最終超決戦VIII: 約束の日, Saishū Chō Kessen VIII: Yakusoku no Hi; "The Final Showdown VIII: Goal on the 80th Day"); 268. "The Escape!" (脱出!!, Dasshutsu!!; "Escape!") (Included in Volume 23 of Viz Media release); 269. "Return to Pallet Town" (姿なき攻撃者, Sugata Naki Kougeki Sha; "Shapeless Attacker") (Included in Volume 23 of Viz Media release)
Ruby and Courtney reach the two Ancient Pokémon, but Maxie traps Courtney inside a shrine which collapses as result of the battle, killing her. Norman comes with Rayquaza, taking Courtney's spot to stop the Ancient Pokémon alongside Ruby. The attack succeeds with the Ancient Pokémon going back their dwelling, but both Norman and Steven sacrifice themselves as a result of controlling Ancient Pokémon without an orb. Maxie and Archie reappear to take the orbs again, and stop their foes. Inspired by Feebas' return - which was later evolved to Milotic, Ruby joins forces with a returning Sapphire to defeat Maxie and Archie. Ruby then releases his sixth Pokémon - Celebi, who takes the orbs and changes the future, reverting the deaths that occurred. Immediately after, Ruby and Sapphire complete their bet within the 80 days promised, and celebrate Sapphire's birthday. The story then moves to Kanto where Red and Blue learn that Oak disappeared and left a message which orders to give up their Pokédex.

==== FireRed & LeafGreen chapter ====
No.	Title	Original release date	English release date
23	— Fierce Fighting in the Sevii Islands (ナナシマでの激闘)	October 27, 2006; 4-09-140254-2	July 1, 2014; 978-1-4215-3557-9
270. "Now You See Me..." (飲み込む闇, Nomikomu Yami; "The Swallowing Darkness"); 271. "...Now You Don't" (シルフスコープの中に, Silph Scope no Naka ni; "Within the Silph Scope"); 272. "Old Ultima Puts Them to the Test" (2の島のキワメ婆, 2 No Shima no Kiwame Baba; "Old Kimberly of Two Island"); 273. "Red and Blue Make Purple Opponents" (戦ノ道, Sen no Michi; "The Battle Path"); 274. "Double Dealing with Deoxys" (発動 究極技, Hatsudou Kyuukyoku Waza; "Activate: The Ultimate Move"); 275. "A Vicious Cycle of Possibilities" (動き始める首領, Ugoki Hajimeru Shuryou; "The Boss Gets Off"); 276. "My, My, My Mimic" (伝承 草と炎, Denshou Sou to Honoo; "Legend - Grass and Fire"); 277. "A Beastly Cold Reception!" (三獣士登場, San Shishi Shi Toujou; "Enter the Three Beasts"); 278. "Put Your Beast Foot Forward!" (全島攻撃, Zentou Kougeki; "Attacking the Entire Island"); 279. "Don't Doubt Deoxys" (降り立つデオキシス, Ori Tatsu Deokishisu; "Deoxys Gets Down")
Red and Blue take the Sea Gallop to search Professor Oak in the Sevii Islands. There, Green is attacked by the mysterious Pokémon - Deoxys, who absorbs her parents when reaching One Island. While Green is recovering, Red and Blue learn of the situation and take part in a competition by an elder known as Ultima who is able to teach them their Venusaur's and Charizard's strongest attacks. The two pass the test head to Four Island where they meets with Bill and Lorelei, and were attacked by a trio of villains working for Team Rocket - Carr, Sird and Orm, whose leader Giovanni is related with another Deoxys labeled as "Organism No. 2". During the battles, they learn that another Organism No. 1 is attacking the Pokédex holders while Professor Oak has been kidnapped by Orm. Back to Five Island, Organism No. 2 attacks Red - with "Psycho Boost", overwhelming all his team.
24	— Defeat and Frustration (敗北と挫折)	January 26, 2007; 978-4-09-140318-6	September 2, 2014; 978-1-4215-3558-6
280. "Some Things Are Better Left Unown" (敗れし者レッド, Yabure Shi Sha Reddo; "Red, Man of Failure"); 281. "Not Exactly Normal" (フォルムチェンジの秘密, Forme Change no Himitsu; "The Secret of Forme Change"); 282. "Going Green" (所有者の資格, Shoyuu Sha no Shikaku; "Holders' Requirements"); 283. "It Takes Patience, Knowledge and a Really Quick Beedrill" (戦う訳, Tatakau Wake; "Reason to Fight"); 284. "Red, Green, Blue and Mewtwo Too" (ミュウツー参戦, Myuutsū Sansen; "Mewtwo Participates in the Battle"); 285. "Once More into the Unown" (意志を持つタワー, Ishi o Motsu Tawā; "Tower with Will"); 286. "Meet Deoxys, and Deoxys, and Deoxys, and..." (襲い来る分身群, Osoi Kuru Bunshin Gun; "Attack of Clone Herd"); 287. "Secrets from Sneasel" (故郷トキワシティ, Kokyou Towika Shiti; "Hometown Towika City")
Blue and Green learn of Red's defeat, but he refuses fighting Deoxys again as a result of a horrifying feeling he had during the battle. Organism No. 2 is then captured by Giovanni who used the Dark Pokédex to analyze Deoxys' abilities using Organism No. 2 and Red's battle. Upon deciding he will face his fears, Red is joined by Mewtwo - A genetic Pokémon, who wishes to fight by his side. Red then rejoins Blue and Green heads to Team Rocket's hideout at the Seven Island. There they are attacked by multiple traps, rescues Professor Oak and Green's parents, and confront Giovanni once again. After Giovanni escapes, Organism No. 1 remains and Mewtwo was paralyzed by an armor designed to suppress his powers. Back in Viridian City, Yellow meets Silver who is searching for his parents.
25	— Showdown at the Peak (頂上対決)	March 28, 2007; 978-4-09-140329-2	November 4, 2014; 978-1-4215-3559-3
288. "Give It Your Best, Blastoise" (拘束具を破れ, Kousoku gu o Yabure; "Breaking the Restraint"); 289. "Surprised by Sneasel" (拘束具を破れ, Kokoro no Oku no Towika; "Towika in Heart"); 290. "A Well-Journeyed Jumpluff" (宙空の決戦場, Chuu Sora no Kessen Jou; "Battle Place in Space"); 291. "Can Mewtwo Dish It Out with a Spoon?" (頂上対決, Choujou Taiketsu; "Summit Confrontation"); 292. "Bested by Banette" (父の名はサカキ, Chichi no Na ha Sakaki; "Father's Name is Sakaki"); 293. "Down-for-the-Count Deoxys" (まやかしのオーロラ, Mayakashi no ōrora; "The Fake Aurora"); 294. "Mewtwo and Mew Too!" (幻は最果てに, Maboroshi ha Saihate ni; "Mirage is Far Away"); 295. "Double Down Deoxys" (ラストショット, Last Shot; "Last Shot"); 296. "It's Starting to Make Sense Now" (デオキシス そのルーツ, Deokishisu sono Roots; "Deoxys, His Roots"); 297. "Mewtwo Comes Through" (反乱のチャクラ, Hanran no Chakura; "Rebellious Chakura"); 298. "Start the Countdown, Starmie" (脱出のブラックホール, Dasshutso no Black Hole; "Escape from a Black Hole")
Red, Blue and Green free Mewtwo from Giovanni's armor and both Red and Mewtwo follow the track to Team Rocket's aircraft. Sird and Orm track Silver who is revealed to be Giovanni's son and fight him to take him to his father. Silver collapses upon learning that he is Giovanni's son and is kidnapped. Back inside the aircraft, Red and Giovanni start a one-on-one Battle using Mewtwo and Deoxys, respectively. As Red and Mewtwo are able to weaken Organism No. 2 (Deoxys), while Yellow arrives to rescue Silver. Wishing to take Giovanni's legacy, Carr places 10 Fortress into the aircraft to make collapse as he decided to destroy all people and escapes. Red decides to stop the aircraft's destruction and Yellow reads Organism No. 2's mind one last time.

==== Emerald chapter ====
No.	Title	Original release date	English release date
26	— Dazzling Frontier (まばゆきフロンティア)	June 23, 2007; 978-4-09-140366-7	January 6, 2015; 978-1-4215-3560-9
299. "Distant Relation Deoxys" (本能の呼びかけ, Honnou no Yobikake; "Call of Instinct") (Included in Volume 25 of Viz Media release); 300. "Right on Time, Rhydon" (父の魂, Chichi no Tamashii; "Father's Soul") (Included in Volume 25 of Viz Media release); 301. "Storming the Forretress" (戦う者 レッド, Tatakau Mono Reddo; "Red, the Battler") (Included in Volume 25 of Viz Media release); 302. "Phew for Mew" (所有者たちの絆, Shoyuu Sha Tachi no Kizuna; "Holders' Bond") (Included in Volume 25 of Viz Media release); 303. "Never Spritz a Knotty Sudowoodo" (VSウソッキー: まばゆきフロンティア, VS Usokkie: Mabayuki Furontia; "VS Usokkie: Dazzling Frontier"); 304. "Swanky Showdown with Swalot" (VSマルノーム: 穏やかな弾丸, VS Marunoom: Odayaka na Dangan; "VS Marunoom: Bullet of Tranquility"); 305. "Interesting Interactions Involving Illumise" (VSイルミーゼ: 挑戦7つの施設, "VS Irumīze": Chōsen nanatsu no Shisetsu; "VS Illumise: Challenging the Seven Facilities"); 306. "Pinsir Me, I Must Be Dreaming" (VSカイロス: 知識のブレーン, VS Kairosu: Chishiki no Burēn; "VS Kailios: Frontier Brain of Knowledge"); 307. "Gotcha Where I Wantcha, Glalie" (VS オニゴーリ: 怪しき影, VS Onigōri: Ayashiki Kage; "VS Onigōri: A Suspicious Shadow"); 308. "As Luck Would Have It, Kirlia" (VSキルリア: 送信要請, VS Kiruria: Sōshin Yōsei; "VS Kirlia: Transmission Request")
Yellow reveals that Organism No. 2 (Deoxys) has Red's blood in its body which caused his berserker state in which he attacked Red in an attempt to communicate with him. As Yellow and Mewtwo are transported outside from aircraft by Organism No. 2, Red joins forces with it to stop the Fortress. Meanwhile, Silver is saved by a weakened Giovanni, and decides to protect him. While the aircraft was landed safely and having their reunion, Sird reappears and trying to capture Organism No. 2 while it goes off to search Organism No. 1 and the five Pokédex holders sacrifice themselves and turn into a stone. The story then moves to the Hoenn's Battle Frontier, an area where Trainers compete against the seven experts known as the Frontier Brains. A young Trainer named Emerald enters into the competition, and takes part in the Battle Factory contest where he have to use rental Pokémon. Emerald succeeds in defeating the Frontier Brain Noland using a rented Sceptile which he takes with him. Next day, Emerald enters into the Battle Pike where he uses Pokémon given by his Crystal.
27	Awakening of the Millennium; Awakening of the Millennium (千年の目覚め)	August 28, 2007; 978-4-09-140398-8	March 3, 2015; 978-1-4215-3561-6
309. "Moving Past Milotic" (VSミロカロス: チューブのクイーン, VS Mirokarosu: Chūbu no Kuīn; "VS Milokaross: The Pike Queen"); 310. "Just My Luck...Shuckle" (VSツボツボ: 運がよければ, VS Tsubotsubo: Un ga yokere ba; "VS Tsubotsubo: If You're Lucky..."); 311. "A Dust-Up With Dusclops" (VSサマヨール: ふるさとの土, VS Samayouru: Furusato no Do; "VS Samayouru: Hometown Soil"); 312. "Chipping Away at Regirock" (VSレジロック: ピラミッドアドベンチャー, VS Rejirokku: Piramiddo Adobenchā; "VS Regirock: Pyramid Adventures"); 313. "You Need to Chill Out, Regice" (VSレジアイス: 空翔ける星, VS Rejiaisu: Sora Kakeru Hoshi; "VS Regice: The Flying Star"); 314. "A Sketchy Smattering of Smeargle" (VSドーブル: アトリエの洞窟, VS Dōburu: Atorie no Dōkutsu; "VS Doble: Artisan's Cave"); 315. "Skirting Around Surskit I" (VSアメタマI: 甲冑の男, VS Ametama I: Kacchū no Otoko; "VS Ametama I: The Armored Man"); 316. "Skirting Around Surskit II" (VSアメタマII: タイクーンの実力, VS Ametama II: Taikūn no Jitsuryoku; "VS Ametama II: The Salon Maiden's Prowess"); 317. "Sneaky Like Shedinja I" (VSヌケニンI: オーナーの真意, VS Nukenin I: Ōnā no Shini; "VS Nukenin I: The Owner's Real Motive")
Emerald continues conquering areas in the Battle Frontier, defeating Lucy in the Battle Pike and Brandon in the Battle Pyramid. During these events, an armored person known as Guile beats up Noland to steal the rental Pokémon in order to capture Jirachi. Determined to capture the criminal, the Frontier Brains challenge Emerald's innocence and learns that his main objective is also capturing Jirachi which is able to grant people's wishes. They encounter Guile at Artisan Cave who found Jirachi and start fighting. Upon Jirachi's escape, Guile leaves the area. Battle Frontier's creator Scott reveals Professor Oak sent Emerald to capture Jirachi but Scott had agreed with Professor Oak in one condition. To prepare themselves for another fight with Guile, Emerald challenges Frontier Brain Greta, using Pokémon that grew attached to him in the past days.
28	The Stolen Wishing Star; The Stolen Wishing Star (奪わるる願い星)	December 25, 2007; 978-4-09-140456-5	May 5, 2015; 978-1-4215-3562-3
318. "Sneaky Like Shedinja II" (VSヌケニンII: 勝利を呼ぶ闘志, VS Nukenin II: Shōri o Yobu Tōshi; "VS Nukenin II: The Fighting Spirit of Victory"); 319. "Verily Vanquishing Vileplume I" (VSラフレシアI: トーナメント in ドーム, VS Rafureshia I: Tōnamento in Dōmu; "VS Ruffresia I: Dome Tournament"); 320. "Verily Vanquishing Vileplume II" (VSラフレシアII: 助っ人 到着, VS Rafureshia I: Suketto Tōchaku; "VS Ruffresia II: Here Comes the Helpers!"); 321. "Cunning Kirlia" (VSキルリア: ルビー対エメラルド, VS Kiruria: Rubī tai Emerarudo; "VS Kirlia: Ruby Versus Emerald"); 322. "Susceptible to Sceptile" (VSジュカイン: 本来のパートナー, VS Jukain: Honrai no Pātonā; "VS Jukain: Original Partner"); 323. "A Cheeky Charizard Change-Up I" (VSリザードンI: スーパースターの戦略, VS Rizādon I: Sūpāsutā no Senryaku; "VS Lizardon: Superstar Tactics"); 324. "A Cheeky Charizard Change-Up II" (VSリザードンII: 宝珠の残像, VS Rizādon II: Hōshu no Zanzō; "VS Lizardon: Vestige of the Orb"); 325. "Standing in the Way with Starmie" (VSスターミー: ガイル再び, VS Sutāmī: Gairu Futatabi; "VS Starmie: Guile Returns"); 326. "Lemme at 'Em, Lapras!" (VSラプラス: 突入 バトルタワー, VS Rapurasu: Totsunyū Batoru Tawā; "VS Laplace: Invasion of the Battle Tower"); 327. "Facing Gulpin Is Hard to Swallow" (VSゴクリン: 甲冑の素顔, VS Gokurin: Kacchū no Sugao; "VS Gokulin: The Face Behind the Armor")
Emerald wins his fight against Greta as a result of him cheering up his Pokémon which give him his main points from the area. Meanwhile, Ruby and Sapphire are dispatched to the Battle Frontier to help Emerald, and thus, Professor Oak. They enter into the Battle Dome where the two are defeated by Emerald and Frontier Brain Tucker respectively. Confused by Ruby's comments regarding the care for Pokémon, Emerald refuses to use his own Pokémon against Tucker, but is defeated. Shortly afterwards, Guile manages to capture Jirachi and goes to the top of the Battle Tower, where it can grant his wishes. After leaving his Pokémon to fight Spenser's on their own in the Battle Palace, Emerald joins Ruby, Sapphire and Noland to stop Guile who is possessing Anabel. Spenser arrives to the area and reveals Guile is the boss of Team Aqua - Archie.
29	Assembly of the Ten; Gathering of the Ten (10人の集結)	November 27, 2008; 978-4-09-140743-6	July 7, 2015; 978-1-4215-3563-0
328. "The Final Battle I" (大決戦I: 海の魔物, Daikessen I: Umi no Mamono; "The Final Showdown I: Monster of the Sea"); 329. "The Final Battle II" (大決戦II: 星に願いを, Daikessen II: Hoshi ni Negai o; "The Final Showdown II: Wish Upon A Star"); 330. "The Final Battle III" (大決戦III: 開かない心, Daikessen III: Hiraka Nai Kokoro; "The Final Showdown III: An Unopened Heart"); 331. "The Final Battle IV" (大決戦IV: 憧れと尊敬と, Daikessen IV: Akogare to Sonkei to; "The Final Showdown IV: Admiration, Respect, and..."); 332. "The Final Battle V" (大決戦V: 新しい自分, Daikessen V: Atarashī Jibun; "The Final Showdown V: A New Self"); 333. "The Final Battle VI" (大決戦VI: 真実の瞳, Daikessen VI: Shinjitsu no Hitomi; "The Final Showdown VI: The Eye of Truth"); 334. "The Final Battle VII" (大決戦VII: 10人の集結, Daikessen VII: Junin no Shūketsu; "The Final Showdown VII: Gathering of the Ten"); 335. "The Final Battle VIII" (大決戦VIII: トリプルXトリプル, Daikessen VIII: Toripuru x Toripuru; "The Final Showdown VIII: Triple X Triple"); 336. "The Final Battle IX" (大決戦IX: 授けし者, Daikessen IX: Sazukeshi Sha; "The Final Showdown IX: Those Who Are Endowed"); 337. "Epilogue" (Epilogue: いっそ全員で, Epilogue: Isso Zenin De; "Epilogue: Might As Well")
Archie uses Jirachi's power to create a copy of Kyogre and cause chaos once again. Gold and Crystal join the fight, and teach Ruby, Sapphire and Emerald to master the ultimate elemental attacks to their Pokémon. As they recover Jirachi, Emerald makes a wish to restore Red, Blue, Green, Yellow and Silver to their original forms, and they join the others to stop Archie. While Red and Gold destroy Archie's protective armor, Emerald takes away his control of the rental Pokémon. The ten Pokédex holders then unleash the ultimate elemental attacks to destroy the Kyogre copy. Archie's body disintegrates as his body became unstable as a result of overusing the blue orb, while the armor was meant to protect him. After Archie disappears, Scott uses Jirachi's final wish to attract more visitors to the Battle Frontier and Red decides to take part on tournament with all Pokédex holders. In the end, Emerald conquer all the facilities.

==== Diamond & Pearl chapter ====
No.	Title	Original release date	English release date
30	Onwards to Sinnoh...! To the Shin'ō Region...! (シンオウ地方へ...！！)	December 25, 2008; 978-4-09-140770-2	March 1, 2011; 978-1-4215-3816-7
338. "Stagestruck Starly" (VSムックル: パールとダイヤ, VS Mukkuru: Pāru to Daiya; "VS Mukkuru: Pearl and Dia"); 339. "A Bevy of Bidoof" (VSビッパ: ビッパとお嬢様, VS Bippa: Bippa to Ojōsama; "VS Bippa: Bidoof and Missy"); 340. "Extreme Luxio" (VSルクシオ: ツッコミとリズム, VS Rukushio: Tsukkomi to Rizumu; "VS Luxio: Quipping and Rhythms"); 341. "Putting a Crimp in Kricketot" (VSコロボーシ: ポッチャマとプライド, VS Korobōshi: Pocchama to Puraido; "VS Korobōshi: Young Master and Pride"); 342. "A Conk on Cranidos's Cranium" (VSズガイドス: ヒョウタとクロガネジム, VS Zugaidos: Hyouta to Kurogane Jimu; "VS Zugaidos: Roark and the Oreburgh Gym"); 343. "Honey for Combee" (VSミツハニー: 花畑と甘い蜜, VS Mitsuhanī: Hanahata to Amai Mitsu; "VS Mitsuhoney: Flower Fields and Sweet Honey"); 344. "Belligerent Bronzor" (VSドーミラー: 発電所と砂嵐, VS Dōmirā: Hatsudensho to Sunaarashi; "VS Dōmirā: Power Plants and Sandstorms"); 345. "Robust Rotom" (VSロトム: 森と洋館, VS Rotomu: Mori to Yōkan; "VS Rotom: Forests and Chateaus"); 346. "Ring Around the Roserade I" (VSロズレイドI: 特訓と初進化, VS Rozureido I: Tokkun to Hatsu Shinka; "VS Roserade I: Training and First Evolution")
Two comedians from the Sinnoh region, Diamond and Pearl, receive a prize in a contest, but as a result of an accident with Professor Rowan, they are given a wrong one. The duo believe they are going on a tour to Mt. Coronet with a young Trainer known as Lady Berlitz acting as their guide, while Lady instead believes they are the bodyguards hired by her father for the journey. The trio go on the journey unaware of the misunderstanding, but manage to get along.
31	Team Galactic Moves Out; The Galaxey Gang Moves Out (動きだすギンガ)	March 27, 2009; 978-4-09-140799-3	June 7, 2011; 978-1-4215-3817-4
347. "Ring Around the Roserade II" (VSロズレイドII: ロズレイドと毒のトゲ, VS Rozureido II: Rozureido to Doku no Toge; "VS Roserade II: Roserade and Poison Spikes"); 348. "A Big Stink Over Stunky" (VSスカンプー: 自転車とスカンプー, VS Sukanpū: Jitensha to Sukanpū; "VS Skunpū: Bicycles and Stunky"); 349. "Passing by Probopass and Maneuvering around Magnezone" (VSダイノーズ&ジバコイル: シンオウ地方とテンガン山, VS Dainōzu & Jibakoiru: Shinou Chihō to Tengan San; "VS Dainose & Jibacoil: Sinnoh Region and Mt. Coronet"); 350. "Boogying with Buneary" (VSミミロル: お嬢様とコンテスト, VS Mimiroru: Ojōsama to Kontesuto; "VS Mimirol: Missy and Contests"); 351. "Perturbed by Pachirisu" (VSパチリス: 会長と三人組, VS Pachirisu: Kaichō to San Ningumi; "VS Pachirisu: President and the Trio"); 352. "Crowded by Croagunk & Advanced on by Abra I" (VSグレッグル&ケーシィI: メリッサとロストタワー, VS Gureggru & Casei I: Merissa to Rosuto Tawā; "VS Gureggru & Casey I: Fantina and the Lost Tower"); 353. "Crowded by Croagunk & Advanced on by Abra II" (VSグレッグル&ケーシィII: パカとウージ, VS Gureggru & Casei II: Paka to Wuji; "VS Gureggru & Casey II: Paka and Uji"); 354. "Knowledge of the Unown I" (VSアンノーンI: 新聞社と謎の文字, VS Annōn I: Shinbunsha to Nazo no Moji; "VS Unown I: News Company and Mysterious Letters"); 355. "Knowledge of the Unown II" (VSアンノーンII: アンノーンと古代遺跡, VS Annōn II: Annōn to Kodai Iseki; "VS Unown II: Unowns and Ancient Relics")
While Diamond, Pearl and Lady continue on their journey, the two men originally hired to be Lady's bodyguards now go on a ruthless search for their client, only to find themselves becoming the target of a mysterious group whose members all wear astronaut-like outfits.
32	The Real Bodyguards; The Real Bodyguards (本物の護衛)	June 19, 2009; 978-4-09-140839-6	October 4, 2011; 978-1-4215-3818-1
356. "Magnificent Meditite & Really Riolu I" (VSアサナン&リオルI: スロットとスモモ, VS Asanan & Rioru I: Surotto to Sumomo; "VS Asanan & Riolu I: Slots and Maylene"); 357. "Magnificent Meditite & Really Riolu II" (VSアサナン&リオルII: ジム戦とゲームコーナー, VS Asanan & Rioru II: Jimusen to Gēmu Kōnā; "VS Asanan & Riolu II: Gym Battles and Game Corners"); 358. "Stunning Staravia & Stinky Skuntank I" (VSムクバード&スカタンクI: 令嬢とボディーガード, VS Mukubādo & Sukatanku I: Reijō to Bodīgādo; "VS Mukubird & Skuntank I: Ladies and Bodyguards"); 359. "Stunning Staravia & Stinky Skuntank II" (VSムクバード&スカタンクII: 敵と味方, VS Mukubādo & Sukatanku II: Teki to Mikata; "VS Mukubird & Skuntank II: Friends and Foes"); 360. "Great Gible" (VSフカマル: 終わりと始まり, VS Fukamaru: Owari to Hajimari; "VS Fukamaru: The End and Beginning"); 361. "Bombastic Bibarel & Heroic Hippopotas" (VSビーダル&ヒポポタス: 雨と足跡, VS Bīdaru & Hipopotasu: Ame to Ashiato; "VS Beadull & Hipopotas: Rain and Footprints"); 362. "Dramatic Drapion & Crafty Kricketune I" (VSドラピオン&コロトックI: 光と記憶, VS Dorapion & Korotokku I: Hikari to Kioku; "VS Dorapion & Korotok I: Light and Memories"); 363. "Dramatic Drapion & Crafty Kricketune II" (VSドラピオン&コロトックII: 湖と影, VS Dorapion & Korotokku II: Mizuumi to Kage; "VS Dorapion & Korotok II: Lakes and Shadows"); 364. "A Skuffle with Skorupi" (VSスコルピ: 大湿原とサファリゲーム, VS Sukorupi: Daishitsugen to Safari Gēmu; "VS Skorpi: Marshlands and Safari Games")
While fighting the mysterious Team Galactic at Veilstone City, Diamond and Pearl meet the two men in suits that were supposed to be Lady's bodyguards. Before they could negotiate further, a beam strikes the two bodyguards and makes them vanish.
33	Attack on Celestic; Attack on Kannagi (カンナギ襲撃)	October 28, 2009; 978-4-09-140868-6	February 7, 2012; 978-1-4215-3912-6
365. "Crafty Carnivine" (VSマスキッパ: マキシとノモセシティ, VS Masukippa: Makishi to Nomoseshiti; "VS Muskippa: Crasher Wake and Pastoria"); 366. "Floatzel and Jetsam" (VSフローゼル: 勝利とファイトマネー, VS Furōzeru: Shōri to Faito Manē; "VS Flowsel: Victory and Fight Money"); 367. "Suffering Psyduck" (VSコダック: コダックと秘伝の薬, VS Kodakku: Kodakku to Hiden no Kusuri; "VS Koduck: Psyduck and the Elixirs"); 368. "Problematic Probopass and Mad Magnezone I" (VSダイノーズ&ジバコイルI: カンナギと長老, VS Dainōzu & Jibakoiru I: Kan Nagi to Chōrō; "VS Dainose & Jibacoil I: Celestic and the Elder"); 369. "Problematic Probopass and Mad Magnezone II" (VSダイノーズ&ジバコイルII: 壁画と襲撃者, VS Dainōzu & Jibakoiru II: Hekiga to Shūgekisha; "VS Dainose & Jibacoil II: Wall Paintings and Attackers"); 370. "Problematic Probopass and Mad Magnezone III" (VSダイノーズ&ジバコイルIII: 意志と感情, VS Dainōzu & Jibakoiru III: Ishi to Kanjō; "VS Dainose & Jibacoil III: Willpower and Emotion"); 371. "Drifting Drifblim" (VSフワライド: 学会と誘拐, VS Fuwarido: Gakkai to Yūkai; "VS Fuwaride: Academic Convention and Abduction"); 372. "Mirages of Mismagius I" (VSムウマージI: ヨスガジムと計算問題, VS Muumāji I: Yosuga Jimu to Keisan Mondai; "VS Mumargi I: Hearthome Gym and Miscalculations"); 373. "Mirages of Mismagius II" (VSムウマージII: 幻覚と現実, VS Muumāji II: Genkaku to Genjitsu; "VS Mumargi II: Illusions and Reality"); 374. "Brash Bronzong I" (VSドータクンI: 娘と父, VS Dōtakun I: Musume to Chichi; "VS Dōtakun: Father and Daughter")
Diamond, Pearl and Lady meet Team Galactic's leader Cyrus in Celestic Town. Cyrus has his sights on the forbidden ruins of the town, and Diamond tries to stop him. In doing so, his relationship with Pearl deteriorates. Meanwhile, Lady's father is shocked to hear that Team Galactic have captured his daughter.
34	The Revealed Truth; The Truth is Revealed (明かされる真実)	February 26, 2010; 978-4-09-140887-7	June 5, 2012; 978-1-4215-3913-3
375. "Brash Bronzong II" (VSドータクンII: 真実と偽り, VS Dōtakun II: Shinjitsu to Itsuwari; "VS Dōtakun II: Truth and Deception"); 376. "Startling Staraptor" (VSムクホーク: 決意と告白, VS Mukuhōku: Ketsui to Kokuhaku; "VS Mukuhawk: Resolve and Confession"); 377. "Hurrah for Rapidash" (VSギャロップ: 別れと旅立ち, VS Gyaroppu: Wakare to Tabidachi; "VS Gallop: Parting and Journey"); 378. "Grumpy Gliscor" (VSグライオン: シンオウ丸と船出, VS Guraion: Shinoumaru to Funade; "VS Glion: Sinnohmaru and Sailing"); 379. "Lucky Lucario I" (VSルカリオI: ゲンとこうてつ島, VS Rukario I: Gen to Kōtetsutō; "VS Lucario I: Riley and Iron Island"); 380. "Lucky Lucario II" (VSルカリオII: 洞窟と卒業課題, VS Rukario II: Dōkutsu to Sotsugyō Kadai; "VS Lucario II: Caverns and Graduation Assignments"); 381. "Vexing Vespiquen & Unmanageable Mothim I" (VSビークイン&ガーメイルI: すばやさとはっぱカッター, VS Bīkuin & Gāmeiru I: Subayasa to Happa Kattā; "VS Beequeen & Garmeil I: Speed and "Razor Leaf""); 382. "Vexing Vespiquen & Unmanageable Mothim II" (VSビークイン&ガーメイルII: 悪意と波導, VS Bīkuin & Gāmeiru II: Akui to Nami Shirube; "VS Beequeen & Garmeil II: Animosity and Aura"); 383. "Winning Over Wingull" (VSキャモメ: 製鉄所と発注書, VS Kyamome: Seitetsusho to Hacchūsho; "VS Camome: Ironworks and Purchase Orders"); 384. "Maddening Magby" (VSブビィ: タタラと動く床, VS Bubi: Tatara to Ugoku Yuka; "VS Bubi: Fuego and Moving Tiles")
Lady refused to hear that Diamond and Pearl were not her real bodyguards. However, she apologizes, and reaffirms the trust she had with Diamond and Pearl, by giving them her full name - Platinum Berlitz. Meanwhile, Team Galactic hatch their biggest plan yet - to blow up the three lakes of Sinnoh and capture the three lake guardians.
35	Legendary Beat; The Beat of Legends (伝説の鼓動)	May 28, 2010; 978-4-09-141057-3	October 2, 2012; 978-1-4215-3914-0
385. "Showdown with Houndoom" (VSヘルガー: 矢印と透視力, VS Herugā: Yajirushi to Tōshi Ryoku; "VS Hellgar: Arrows and X-Ray Vision"); 386. "Disagreeable Graveler" (VSゴローン: 雪山とジムリーダー, VS Gorōn: Yukiyama to Jimu Rīdā; "VS Golone: Snow Mountains and Gym Leaders"); 387. "Striking Out Snover" (VSユキカブリ: キッサキとスズナ, VS Yukikaburi: Kissaki to Suzuna; "VS Yukikaburi: Snowpoint and Candice"); 388. "To and Fro with Froslass" (VSユキメノコ: 新顔と勝利, VS Yukimenoko: Shingao to Shōri; "VS Froslass: New Faces and Victory"); 389. "Cautious Clefairy" (VSピッピ: 宇宙とGマーク, VS Pippi: Uchū to G Māku; "VS Pippi: The Universe and G Mark"); 390. "Licking Lickitung" (VSベロリンガ: ポケッチとキャンペーン, VS Beroringa: Poketchi to Kyanpēn; "VS Beroringa: Pokétchs and Campaigns"); 391. "Luring in a Lickilicky" (VSベロベルト: ベロベルトと宝物, VS Beroberuto: Beroberuto to Hōmotsu; "VS Berobelt: Lickilicky and Butlers"); 392. "Well Met, Weepinbell" (VSウツドン: 豪邸と執事, VS Utsudon: Gōtei to Shitsuji; "VS Utsudon: Mansions and Butlers"); 393. "Yikes, Yanmega! I" (VSメガヤンマI: 研究所とハマナ, VS Megayanma I: Kenkyūjo to Hamana; "VS Megayanma I: Research Labs and Roseanne"); 394. "Yikes, Yanmega! II" (VSメガヤンマII: 羽音と衝撃波, VS Megayanma II: Haoto to Shōgekiha; "VS Megayanma II: Flapping and Shockwaves")
Diamond, Pearl and Platinum are now aware of Team Galactic's plan, and go their separate ways in order to stop them. Pearl's investigation takes him to the Fuego Ironworks, where he finds that only one bomb was being made. Platinum finds herself shivering in the freezing north of Sinnoh, while Diamond follows a trail back home.
36	Enter the Galactic Bomb; The Galaxy Bomb Drops (ギンガ爆弾投下)	August 27, 2010; 978-4-09-141118-1	February 5, 2013; 978-1-4215-4247-8
395. "Stopping Sableye" (VSヤミラミ: エイチ湖とジュピター, VS Yamirami: Eichiko to Jupitā; "VS Yamirami: Lake Acuity and Jupiter"); 396. "Getting Past Gastrodon" (VSトリトドン: 強敵と三人娘, VS Toritoidon: Kyōteki to Sannin Musume; "VS Toritoidon: Strong Enemy and Three Girls"); 397. "Outwitting Octillery" (VSオクタン: 爆弾とカウントダウン, VS Okutan: Bakudan to Kauntodaun; "VS Okutan: Bomb and Countdown"); 398. "Tackling Tangrowth" (VSモジャンボ: 三匹と見えないつながり, VS Mojanbo: Sanhiki to Mienai Tsunagari; "VS Mojanbo: The Three and Invisible Bonds"); 399. "Mixing It Up with Machamp" (VSカイリキー: 激闘と敗北, VS Kairikie: Gekitō to Haiboku; "Kairikie: Fierce Fighting and Defeat"); 400. "Bogging Down Quagsire" (VSヌオー: 大雨と助け手, VS Nuō: Ōame to Tasukeshu; "VS Nuō: Storms and Helpers"); 401. "Besting Buizel I" (VSブイゼルI: 捕獲と弟子入り, VS Buizeru I: Hokaku to Deshi Iri; "VS Buoysel I: Capturing and Apprenticeship"); 402. "Besting Buizel II" (VSブイゼルII: アカギと完全な世界, VS Buizeru II: Akagi to Kanzen na Sekai; "VS Buoysel II: Cyrus and a Perfect World"); 403. "Cleaning Up Grimer" (VSベトベター: パールと新チー, VS Betobetā: Pāru to Shinchī; "VS Betbeter: Pearl and the New Team"); 404. "Encountering Elekid" (VSエレキッド: 敵陣と侵入者, VS Erekiddo: Tekijin to Shinnyūsha; "VS Elekid: Enemy Line and Intruders")
Team Galactic are successful in their capture of the three lake guardians, overcoming resistance from Diamond, Pearl and Platinum. While Diamond finds himself "captured" as well, Pearl and Platinum must learn from their defeats and vow to become stronger.
37	— Gather to the Place of the Decisive Battle (集結決戦の地へ)	November 26, 2010; 978-4-09-141207-2	June 4, 2013; 978-1-4215-5404-4
405. "Shorting Out Electivire" (VSエレキブル: 強さと体験, VS Erekiburu: Tsuyosa to Taiken; "VS Elekible: Strength and Experience"); 406. "Halting Honchkrow" (VSドンカラス: のんきとせっかち, VS Donkarasu: Nonki to Sekkachi; "VS Donkarasu: Carefreeness and Impatience"); 407. "Chancing Upon Chingling" (VSリーシャン: 変装と潜入, VS Rīshan: Hensō to Sennyū; "VS Lisyan: Disguise and Infiltration"); 408. "High-tailing It from Haunter" (VSゴースト: 図鑑と朝の音, VS Gōsuto: Zukan to Asa no Oto; "VS Ghost: Pokédexes and the Morning Sound"); 409. "Shunning Spiritomb" (VSミカルゲ: チャンピオンとBOSS, VS Mikaruge: Champion to Boss; "VS Mikaruge: Champions and Bosses"); 410. "Creeping Away from Cradily" (VSユレイドル: 3匹と解放, VS Yureidoru: Sanhiki to Kaihō; "VS Yuradle: The Three and Liberation"); 411. "Double Trouble with Dialga and Palkia I" (VSディアルガ&パルキアI: 運命とやりの柱, VS Diaruga & Parukia I: Unmei to Yari no Hashira; "VS Dialga & Palkia I: Destiny and Spear Pillar"); 412. "Double Trouble with Dialga and Palkia II" (VSディアルガ&パルキアII: 時間と空間, VS Diaruga & Parukia II: Jikan to Kūkan; "VS Dialga & Palkia II: Time and Space")
Diamond, Pearl and Platinum reunite at Team Galactic's Veilstone compound. However, Team Galactic, having successfully crafted their first Red Chains, but fails to get second chain with interrupted by Cynthia and the same time lake guardians were released by Pokédex holders. Cyrus was soon head to Mt. Coronet for their ultimate goal.

==== Platinum chapter ====
No.	Title	Original release date	English release date
38	The Other Side of This World; The Other Side of the World (この世の裏側)	February 28, 2011; 978-4-09-141208-9	October 1, 2013; 978-1-4215-5405-1
413. "Double Trouble with Dialga and Palkia III" (VSディアルガ&パルキアIII: ときのほうこうとあくうせつだん, VS Diaruga & Parukia III: Toki no Hōkō to Akū Setsudan; "VS Dialga & Palkia III: Roar of Time and Spatial Rend"); 414. "Double Trouble with Dialga and Palkia IV" (VSディアルガ&パルキアIV: SHITAPPAと個体意志, VS Diaruga & Parukia IV: Shitappa to Kotai Ishi; "VS Dialga & Palkia IV: Galactic Grunts and Personal Will"); 415. "Double Trouble with Dialga and Palkia V" (VSディアルガ&パルキアV: 完全と不完全, VS Diaruga & Parukia V: Kanzen to Fukanzen; "VS Dialga & Palkia V: Perfection and Imperfection"); 416. "Double Trouble with Dialga and Palkia VI" (VSディアルガ&パルキアVI: ダイヤとパール, VS Diaruga & Parukia VI: Daiya to Pāru; "VS Dialga & Palkia VI: Dia and Pearl"); 417. "Leaping Past Lopunny" (VSミミロップ: リゾートエリアの待ち合わせ, VS Mimiroppu: Rizōto Eria no Machiawase; "VS Mimilop: Meeting at the Resort Area"); 418. "Deprogramming Porygon-Z" (VSポリゴンZ: ポイントのやりくり, VS Porigon Zetto: Pointo no Yarikuri; "VS Porygon Z: Thrifty on Points"); 419. "Getting the Drop on Gallade I" (VSエルレイドI: キャッスルのブレーン, VS Erureido I: Kyassuru no Burēn; "VS Erureido I: The Castle's Brain"); 420. "Getting the Drop on Gallade II" (VSエルレイドII: 執事の油断, VS Erureido II: Shitsuji no Yudan; "VS Erureido II: The Butler's Carelessness"); 421. "Clobbering Claydol" (VSネンドール: 勝負処のバク, VS Nendōru: Shōbusho no Baku; "VS Nenedoru: Buck of the Battleground"); 422. "Interrupting Ivysaur" (VSフシギソウ: ハードマウンテンのお宝, VS Fushigisō: Hādo Maunten no Otakara; "VS Fushigisou: Treasure of Stark Mountain")
Team Galactic summon the deities of time and space, Dialga and Palkia, and begin to create a new world. But the combined knowledge, emotion and willpower of Diamond, Pearl and Platinum stop them. Even after Team Galactic is stopped and Platinum's journey formally ends, many mysteries remain unsolved. Platinum heads to the small island north-east of Sinnoh to continue her journey.
39	Renegade Dragon; Renegade Dragon (叛骨のドラゴン)	July 28, 2011; 978-4-09-141314-7	February 4, 2014; 978-1-4215-5406-8
423. "Tackling Togekiss" (VSトゲキッス: 取り換えっこのパネル, VS Togekissu: Torikaekko no Paneru; "VS Togekiss: Panel of Mutual Exchange"); 424. "Exit Empoleon" (VSエンペルト: 目覚めの一歩, VS Enperutu: Mezame no Ichiho; "VS Emprete: First Step to Awakening"); 425. "Cooling Off Heatran" (VSヒードラン: 野望のプルート, VS Hidoran: Yabō no Purūto; "VS Heatran: Ambitious Charon"); 426. "Softening Up Kakuna" (VSコクーン: レンタルの施設, VS Kokūn: Rentaru no Shisetsu; "VS Cocoon: Rental Facility"); 427. "Uprooting Seedot" (VSタネボー: 妨害の電波, VS Tanebo: Bōgai no Denpa; "VS Taneboh: Jamming Signals"); 428. "Outlasting Ledian" (VSレディアン: クロツグの頼み事, VS Redian: Kurotsugu no Tanomigoto; "VS Redian: Palmer's Favor"); 429. "Dealing with Dragonite" (VSカイリュー: 激闘のステージ, VS Kairyū: Gekitō no Sutēji; "VS Kairyu: Stage of Fierce Fighting"); 430. "Unplugging Rotom" (VSロトム: 五つの家電品, VS Rotomu: Itsutsu no Kadenhin; "VS Rotom: Five Appliances")
Platinum recruits a new bodyguard, Looker, and challenges the Frontier Brains of the Sinnoh Battle Frontier in order to collect information about the Distortion World. Meanwhile, another Team Galactic commander captures the legendary Pokémon lurking inside Stark Mountain.
40	Legends and Myths! Legends! Phantoms!! (伝説！幻！！)	May 28, 2012; 978-4-09-141468-7	June 3, 2014; 978-1-4215-6179-0
431. "The Final Dimensional Duel I" (異次元決戦I: 叛骨のギラティナ, Jigen Kessen I: Hankotsu no Giratina; "Different Dimension Battle I: Renegade Giratina"); 432. "The Final Dimensional Duel II" (異次元決戦II: 戦士たちの出陣, Jigen Kessen II: Senshitachi no Shutsujin; "Different Dimension Battle II: The Warriors Take to the Battle"); 433. "The Final Dimensional Duel III" (異次元決戦III: 影の一撃, Jigen Kessen III: Kage no Ichigeki; "Different Dimension Battle III: A Strike From Darkness"); 434. "The Final Dimensional Duel IV" (異次元決戦IV: 怒りのフォルムチェンジ, Jigen Kessen IV: Ikari no Forumu Chenji; "Different Dimension Battle IV: Form Change of Fury"); 435. "The Final Dimensional Duel V" (異次元決戦V: 偵察機の主, Jigen Kessen V: Teisatsuki no Aruji; "Different Dimension Battle V: Owner of the Spy Plane"); 436. "The Final Dimensional Duel VI" (異次元決戦VI: 集団戦の始まり, Jigen Kessen VI: Shūdansen no Hajimari; "Different Dimension Battle VI: Start of the Group Battle"); 437. "The Final Dimensional Duel VII" (異次元決戦VII: 反物質の世界, Jigen Kessen VII: Hanbusshitsu no Sekai; "Different Dimension Battle VII: Antimatter World"); 438. "The Final Dimensional Duel VIII" (異次元決戦VIII: 心のありよう, Jigen Kessen VIII: Kokoro no Ariyō; "Different Dimension Battle VIII: Where the Heart is"); 439. "The Final Dimensional Duel IX" (異次元決戦IX: 正義のウイリス, Jigen Kessen IX: Seigi no Uirisu; "Different Dimension Battle IX: Righteous Virus"); 440. "The Final Dimensional Duel X" (異次元決戦X: オーキドの手紙, Jigen Kessen X: Ōkido no Tegami; "Different Dimension Battle X: Oak's Letter"); 441. "The Final Dimensional Duel XI" (異次元決戦XI: 魂の光, Jigen Kessen XI: Tamashī no Hikari; "Different Dimension Battle XI: Soul's Light")
Having captured Heatran, Team Galactic scientist Charon goes to Eterna City, where Giratina had descended. There, he makes Heatran fight with Regigigas, which had been with Diamond. Diamond is hit by Giratina and disappears. Charon soon follows Giratina to the Distortion World. Team Galactic's three commanders chase after him. Having gathered all the possible information, Platinum heads to the Distortion World with a few allies, and a former enemy. Pearl joins her there, having learned about Diamond's location. Diamond wakes up in the Distortion World and teams up with Cyrus, who had also ended up at the Distortion World, to free Dialga and Palkia. Platinum's real bodyguards are found. Diamond, Pearl and Platinum, along with all their allies, as well as Cyrus and the three commanders, find that Charon lured all the legendary Pokémon to the Distortion World so that he could assume control of all of them. He soon decides to leave the Distortion World and trap everyone else in it. Upon arrival in the real world, he is impeded by Cynthia, who had fought against Team Galactic before. In the end, everyone inside the Distortion World returns to the real world safely. Cyrus disbands Team Galactic, and Looker arrests Charon once and for all.
