= List of Pokémon Adventures volumes (41–current) =

Pokémon Adventures, known in Japan as Pocket Monsters Special (ポケットモンスター SPECIAL, Poketto Monsutā SPECIAL), is a Japanese manga series published by Shogakukan. The story arcs of the series are based on most of the Pokémon video games released by Nintendo and, as such, the main characters of the series have the name of their video game. Since the manga is based on the video games, there are some delays with the serialization since the authors need to have seen the games in order to continue with the plot.

The series is written by Hidenori Kusaka, it is illustrated by Mato during the first nine volumes, while Satoshi Yamamoto starts illustrating it since the tenth volume. The Japanese publisher Shogakukan has been releasing the individual chapters in tankōbon format with the first one being released on August 8, 1997. This page includes information on volumes 41–60, published between 2012 and the present day.

The distributing company Viz Media has licensed the series for English in the United States. Viz released the first seven volumes of the series in tankōbon format from July 6, 2000 to January 2003 as well as in magazine format. During 2006 they released two volumes with the name of The Best of Pokémon Adventures which are various chapters from the first two arcs put into one book. On June 1, 2009, Viz restarted publishing the tankōbon volumes, publishing every arc past the originals. Volumes 41-60 cover the arcs from HeartGold/SoulSilver to most chapters of X/Y.

== Volume list ==
=== Volumes 41–60 ===
==== HeartGold & SoulSilver chapter ====
No.	Title	Original release date	English release date
41	Johto Again; Jōto Again (ジョウト再び！)	June 28, 2012; 978-4-09-141497-7	August 6, 2013; 978-1-4215-5900-1
442. "Out-Odding Oddish" (VSナゾノクサ: 挑戦 ポケスロン！, VS Nazonokusa; "VS Nazonokusa: Pokéathlon Challenge!"); 443. "Attaway, Aipom!" (VSエイパム: 四天王登場！, VS Eipamu; "VS Eipam: The Four Heavenly Kings Appear!"); 444. "One Tough Togepi" (VSトゲピー: 極秘指令！, VS Togepī; "VS Togepy: Top-Secret Orders!"); 445. "Dealing With A Koffing Fit" (VSドガース: 復活の狼煙！, VS Dogāsu; "VS Dogars: Beacon of Revival!"); 446. "Weavile Wobbles But It Won't Fall Down" (VSマニューラ: サファリゾーンの戦い！, VS Manyūra; "VS Manyula: Safari Zone Battle!"); 447. "Fortunately Feraligatr" (VSオーダイル: プレート争奪戦！, VS Ōdairu; "VS Ordile: Struggle for the Plates!"); 448. "Pleased as Punch With Parasect" (VSパラセクト: 噂の千里眼！, VS Parasekuto; "VS Parasect: The Rumor of Clairvoyance!")
Gold participates in the Pokéathlon and wins all five courses, though he is supposed to be there for more serious matters. With the organiser of the meeting appearing to have vanished, Gold decides to go home, but interest in the matter diverts him to Ecruteak. Silver heads to the new Johto Safari Zone to find out about the mysterious Plates. He encounters Crystal, who had led a field trip to the safari, and they end up working together.
42	The Battle of the Mystri Stage (VIZ Media)/Mystri Stage Battle (Shogakukan Asia); Battle of the Triad Stage (三つ舞台の攻防)	October 26, 2012; 978-4-09-141497-7	October 29, 2013; 978-1-4215-5901-8
449. "Raising the Stakes with Rhyperior" (VSドサイドン: 大地の継承！, VS Dosaidon; "VS Dosidon: Inheritor of the Ground!"); 450. "With a Little Help From Hitmonchan" (VSエビワラー: 集合4将軍！, VS Ebiwarā; "VS Ebiwalar: The Four Generals Assemble!"); 451. "It Takes Xatu to Tango" (VSネイティオ: 遺跡へのルート！, VS Neitio; "VS Natio: To the Ruin's Roots!"); 452. "All About Arceus I" (VSアルセウスI: 伝説のサイン！, VS Aruseusu I; "VS Arceus I: The Legendary's Sign!"); 453. "All About Arceus II" (VSアルセウスII: 語られる起源！, VS Aruseusu II; "VS Arceus II: The Origins are Told!"); 454. "All About Arceus III" (VSアルセウスIII: 突入 謎の領域！, VS Aruseusu III; "VS Arceus III: Breaking into the Area of Mystery!"); 455. "All About Arceus IV" (VSアルセウスIV: 幻のタイプシフト！, VS Aruseusu IV; "VS Arceus IV: The Phantom Type-Shift!"); 456. "All About Arceus V" (VSアルセウスV: 絶望の三つ舞台！, VS Aruseusu V; "VS Arceus V: Triad Stage of Despair!")
Silver and Crystal encounter the Team Rocket Generals, who have resurrected the evil team and aim to capture Arceus, the deity of Pokémon. Arceus appears right in front of Crystal and the Generals give Crystal a go at capturing Arceus, but she fails miserably. Arceus then blows down the Ecruteak Gym. Gold chases it to the Ruins of Alph. Silver, having gathered all the Plates, comes to Gold's aid, along with Crystal. But Arceus transports Gold, Silver, Crystal and the Generals to the Sinjoh Ruins. There, the Generals subdue Arceus and force it to create Dialga, Palkia and Giratina.

==== Black & White chapter ====
No.	Title	Original release date	English release date
43	The Blessing of Happiness (VIZ Media)/Happiness and Blessing (Shogakukan Asia); Happiness Blessing (幸せ 祝福)	January 25, 2013; 978-4-09-141583-7	July 2, 2013; 978-1-4215-5898-1
457. "All About Arceus VI" (VSアルセウスVI: 「はざま」からの帰還！, VS Aruseusu VI; "VS Arceus VI: Return from the "Crack"!") (Included in Volume 42 of Viz Media release); 458. "All About Arceus VII" (VSアルセウスVII: いちるの望み！, VS Aruseusu VII; "VS Arceus VII: A Ray of Hope!") (Included in Volume 42 of Viz Media release); 459. "All About Arceus VIII" (VSアルセウスVIII: 希望の最終進化!, VS Aruseusu VIII: Kibō no Saishū Shinka; "VS Arceus VIII: The Final Evolution of Hope!") (Included in Volume 42 of Viz Media release); 460. "All About Arceus IX" (VSアルセウスIX: 特別な明日！, VS Aruseusu IX; "VS Arceus IX: A Special Tomorrow!") (Included in Volume 42 of Viz Media release); 461. "Fussing and Fighting" (VSポカブ: 前夜, VS Pokabu; "VS Pokabu"); 462. "Choices" (VSクルミル: 旅立, VS Kurumiru; "VS Kurumiru"); 463. "A Nickname for Tepig" (VSコロモリ: 追憶, VS Koromori; "VS Koromori"); 464. "Black's First Trainer Battle" (VSモンメン: 初戦, VS Monmen; "VS Monmen")
Lance, Pryce and Giovanni, who all have a history of evil, join forces to stop Arceus' creation process. But the task of subduing Arceus, who appeared to bear a grudge to humans, is all down to Gold. Meanwhile, in the Unova region, a Pokémon League fanatic is ready to achieve his dream of becoming the ultimate Pokémon Trainer.
44	—	March 28, 2013; 978-4-09-141644-5	November 5, 2013; 978-1-4215-5899-8
465. "Lights, Camera, Action" (VSデンチュラ, VS Dentula; "VS Dentula"); 466. "An Odd Speech" (VSドッコラー, VS Dokkorer; "VS Dokkorer"); 467. "Letting Go" (VSチョロネコ, VS Choroneko; "VS Choroneko"); 468. "Listening to Pokémon" (VSオタマロ, VS Otamaro; "VS Otamaro"); 469. "Welcome to Striaton City!!" (VSタブンネ, VS Tabunne; "VS Tabunne"); 470. "Their First Gym Battle" (VSヤナップ•バオップ•ヒヤップ, VS Yanappu • Baoppu • Hiyappu; "VS Yanappu • Baoppu • Hiyappu"); 471. "Battle at the Dreamyard" (VSミルホッグ, VS Miruhog; "VS Milhog")
Black, a hot-headed boy who dreams of becoming the Pokémon League Champion, encounters White during a filming session. Black interrupts the filming session and damages the filming equipment, so White makes the debt her responsibility by employing Black to her recruitment firm. They travel together through Unova, and encounter a mysterious green-haired man.
45	—	June 28, 2013; 978-4-09-141684-1	March 4, 2014; 978-1-4215-6178-3
472. "Wheeling and Dealing" (VSデンチュラ, VS Zuruggu; "VS Zuruggu"); 473. "Battle at the Museum" (VSミネズミ, VS Minezumi; "VS Minezumi"); 474. "Defeating Stoutland" (VSムーランド, VS Mooland; "VS Mooland"); 475. "The Mystery of the Missing Fossil" (VSデスカーン, VS Desukarn; "VS Desukarn"); 476. "A Direct Attack and a Daunting Defense" (VSヤブクロン・チラチーノ, VS Yabukuron & Chillaccino; "VS Yabukuron & Chillaccino"); 477. "Lost in the Big City" (VSゾロア, VS Zorua; "VS Zorua"); 478. "Big City Battles" (VSハハコモリ, VS Hahakomori; "VS Hahakomori"); 479. "The Case of the Missing Pokémon" (VSモロバレル, VS Morobareru; "VS Morobareru")
Black and White continue on their journey through Unova, visiting the ancient city of Nacrene and the sprawling metropolis of Castelia. They witness the evil actions of Team Plasma, including one where Black's childhood friend Bianca gets attacked.
46	—	July 26, 2013; 978-4-09-141688-9	July 1, 2014; 978-1-4215-6180-6
480. "At Liberty on Liberty Garden" (VSビクティニ: 燈台, VS Bikutini; "VS Victini: Lighthouse"); 481. "Sandstorm" (VSキリキザン: 砂漠, VS Kirikizan; "VS Kirikizan: Desert"); 482. "To Make a Musical" (VSマラカッチ: 準備, VS Marakachi; "VS Maracacchi: Preparation"); 483. "Special Delivery" (VSエモンガ: 開演, VS Emonga; "VS Emonga: Opening Curtain"); 484. "Battle on a Roller Coaster" (VSゼブライカ: 回転, VS Zeburaika; "VS Zebraika: Rotation"); 485. "Gigi's Choice" (VSジャノビー: 数式, VS Janobī; "VS Janovy: Numerical Formula"); 486. "Unraveling Mysteries" (VSナゲキ&ダゲキ: 鉄道, VS Nageki & Dageki; "VS Nageki & Dageki: Railroad"); 487. "A New Perspective" (VSコジョンド: 決意, VS Kojondo; "VS Kojondo: Determination"); 488. "Growing Pains" (VSシキジカ: 別離, VS Shikijika; "VS Shikijika: Parting")
Black and White arrive in Nimbasa City, where White puts the finishing touches on her latest brainchild, the Pokémon Musical, and officially launches it. Just moments after the successful launch, White is trapped in a ferris wheel by N, the green-haired man who challenged Black before. White is traumatized by the events that follow, but recovers and decides to take up battling.
47	—	August 24, 2013; 978-4-09-141587-5	November 4, 2014; 978-1-4215-6181-3
489. "Drawing Bridges" (VSガマガル: 跳橋, VS Gamagaru; "VS Gamagaru: Drawbridge"); 490. "A Stormy Time in the Battle Subway" (VSトルネロス&ボルトロス: 風雷, VS Torunerosu & Borutorosu; "VS Tornelos & Voltolos: Wind and Thunder"); 491. "Fight in a Cold Climate" (VSバニプッチ: 冷凍, VS Banipuchi; "VS Vanipeti: Freezing"); 492. "Mine Mayhem" (VSドリュウズ: 出土, VS Doryuuzu; "VS Doryuzu: Excavation"); 493. "Underground Showdown" (VSワルビル: 感知, VS Warubiru; "VS Waruvile: Perception"); 494. "Up in the Air" (VSココロモリ: 集合, VS Kokoromori; "VS Kokoromori: Assembly"); 495. "The Battle Within" (VSスワンナ: 參戦, VS Suwanna; "VS Swanna: Going to Battle")
Black continues on his quest for Gym Badges to enter the Pokémon League. The very Gym Leaders that he faces start to meddle with Team Plasma.
48	—	November 28, 2013; 978-4-09-141625-4	March 3, 2015; 978-1-4215-7181-2
496. "Museum Showdown" (VSトルネロス&ボルトロス&ランドロスI: 激突, VS Torunerosu & Borutorosu & Randorosu I; "VS Tornelos & Voltolos & Landlos I: Clash"); 497. "Finding Truth" (VSトルネロス&ボルトロス&ランドロスII: 復活, VS Torunerosu & Borutorosu & Randorosu II; "VS Tornelos & Voltolos & Landlos II: Resurrection"); 498. "Decisions, Decisions" (VSフリージオ: 修業, VS Furījio; "VS Freegeo: Training"); 499. "School of Hard Knocks" (VSプロトーガ: 暴走, VS Purotōga; "VS Protoga: Wild-riding"); 500. "With a Little Help from My Friends" (VSメロエッタI: 旋律, VS Meroetta I; "VS Meloetta I: Melody"); 501. "A Lost Melody" (VSメロエッタII: 演奏, VS Meroetta II; "VS Meloetta II: Performance"); 502. "The Beginning" (VSワシボン: 邂逅, VS Washibon; "VS Washibon: Encounter"); 503. "Tooth and Claw" (VSムンナ: 仲間, VS Munna; "VS Munna: Companions")
The Unova Gym Leaders fail to resist Team Plasma's ruthless pursuit of the Dark Stone, which is a sealed form of the legendary Zekrom. Black, who also fails to stop Team Unova, is given an intense training session. Meanwhile White, who is training at the Battle Subway, encounters a distressed Bianca trying to run away from her overprotective father. After cheering Bianca up, White is handed the perfect opportunity to put her newly-acquired skills to the test, and is rewarded with a Pokédex in the end.
49	—	January 25, 2014; 978-4-09-141699-5	April 7, 2015; 978-1-4215-7836-1
504. "The Cold Hard Truth" (VSバニリッチ: 冷凍, VS Banirichi; "VS Vanirich: Indication"); 505. "A Cold Reception" (VSツンベアー: 条件, VS Tsunbeā; "VS Tunbear: Condition"); 506. "Old Wounds" (VSコバルオン&テラキオン&ビリジオンI: 三剣, VS Kobaruon & Terakion & Birijion I; "VS Cobalon & Terrakion & Virizion I: Three Swords"); 507. "A Misunderstanding" (VSコバルオン&テラキオン&ビリジオンII: 信用, VS Kobaruon & Terakion & Birijion II; "VS Cobalon & Terrakion & Virizion II: Trust"); 508. "The Lesson Ends Here" (VSヒヒダルマ: 頂上, VS Hihidaruma; "VS Hihidaruma: Summit"); 509. "Will the Truth Come Out?" (VSアーケオス: 超越, VS Ākeosu; "VS Archeos: Transcendence"); 510. "A Wretched Reunion" (VSダイケンキ: 必要, VS Daikenki; "VS Daikenki: Necessity")
Black reunites with White and together they witness the inevitable; Alder, the Champion of Unova, being defeated by N, the self-proclaimed King of Team Plasma.
50	—	March 25, 2014; 978-4-09-141708-4	July 7, 2015; 978-1-4215-7837-8
511. "Dream a Little Dream" (VSゴチルゼル: 開幕, VS Gochiruzeru; "VS Gothiruselle: Opening"); 512. "Hallway Hijinks" (VSクリムガン: 交信, VS Kurimugan; "VS Crimgan: Communication"); 513. "Into the Quarterfinals!" (VSグレッグル: 潜入, VS Guregguru; "VS Gureggru: Infiltration"); 514. "The Tournament Continues" (VSモノズ: 熱闘, VS Monozu; "VS Monozu: Fierce Fighting"); 515. "The Shadow Triad" (VSケルディオ: 清心, VS Kerudio; "VS Keldeo: Pure Heart"); 516. "One Way or Another" (VSオノンド: 四強, VS Onondo; "VS Onondo: Four Semifinals"); 517. "Something Suspicious" (VSオーベム: 鳴動, VS Ōbemu; "VS Ohbem: Rumbling"); 518. "True Friends" (VSケンホロウ: 親友, VS Kenhorou; "VS Kenhallow: Close Friend")
Black recovers from a traumatic event and manages to gain entry to the Pokémon League at the last minute. During the tournament, a secret agent named Looker attempts to uncover the true identities of some of the suspicious contestants.
51	—	July 25, 2014; 978-4-09-141809-8	October 6, 2015; 978-1-4215-7961-0
519. "Something Suspicious" (VSケルディオII: 狩人, VS Keldeo II; "VS Keldeo II: Hunter"); 520. "Cold Hard Truth " (ゼクロムVSレシラムI: 居城, Zekrom VS Reshiram I; "Zekrom VS Reshiram I: Lord's Castle"); 521. "Triple Threat" (ゼクロムVSレシラムII: 真実, Zekrom VS Reshiram II; "Zekrom VS Reshiram II: Truth"); 522. "Homecoming" (ゼクロムVSレシラムIII: 理想, Zekrom VS Reshiram III; "Zekrom VS Reshiram III: Ideals"); 523. "The Power of Dreams" (ゼクロムVSレシラムIV: 英雄, Zekrom VS Reshiram IV; "Zekrom VS Reshiram IV: Hero"); 524. "A Difficult Parting" (ゼクロムVSレシラムV: 消失, Zekrom VS Reshiram V; "Zekrom VS Reshiram V: Disappearance")
Black, having awakened Reshiram from the Light Stone, is now the Hero of Truth, and squares off against N, the Hero of Ideals who has long since awakened Zekrom. During the face-off, Team Plasma's castle emerges around the Pokémon League complex. N ultimately loses, which brings Ghetsis, the true mastermind behind Team Plasma, into action.

==== Black 2 & White 2 chapter ====
No.	Title	Original release date	English release date
52	—	December 26, 2014; 978-4-09-141894-4	January 3, 2017; 978-1-4215-8437-9
525. The Transfer Student (VSペンドラー: トランスファー・スチューデント, VS Pendoraa; "VS Pendror: Transfer Student"); 526. Mr. Perfect (VSゲノセクトI: ミスター・パーフェクト, VS Genosect I; "VS Genosect I: Mister Perfect"); 527. Flying Type (VSゲノセクトII: フライング・インセクト, VS Genosect II; "VS Genosect II: Flying Insect"); 528. Innocent Scientist (VSゲノセクトIII: イノセント・サイエンティスト, VS Genosect III; "VS Genosect III: Innocent Scientist"); 529. Pokédex Lecture (VSタマゲタケ: ポケデクス・レクチャー, VS Tamagetake; "VS Tamagetake: Pokédex Lecture"); 530. Movie Panic (VSバルチャイ: ムービーズ・パニック, VS Baruchai; "VS Valchai: Movies Panic"); 531. Unforgettable Memories (VSプルリル: アンフォゲッタブル・メモリー, VS Pururiru; "VS Pururill: Unforgettable Memory")
Blake, a seemingly normal boy enrolled in the Aspertia Trainer's School, is actually an undercover International Police officer, tasked with seeking out a former Team Plasma member. The clues lead him to Whitley, the new student, but so far his efforts to flirt with her have been in vain.
53	—	August 8, 2017; 978-4-09-142412-9	July 10, 2018; 978-1-4215-8438-6
532. Legendary Tornadus (VSトルネロスれいじゅうフォルムI: レジェンダリー・トルネード, VS Torunerosu I; VS Tornelos Sacred Beast Forme I: Legendary Tornado); 533. New Sword Player (VSトルネロスれいじゅうフォルムII: ニュー・ソードプレイヤー, VS Torunerosu II; VS Tornelos Sacred Beast Forme II: New Sword Player); 534. Choir Tournament (VSシキジカ: コーラス・コンペティション, VS Shikijika; VS Shikijika: Chorus Competition); 535. Angry Boy (VSオーベム: アングリー・ボーイ, VS Ōbemu; VS Ohbem: Angry Boy); 536. Cold Storage Battle (VSキュレムI: コンテナ・バトル, VS Kyuremu I; VS Kyurem I: Container Battle); 537. Colress Machine (VSキュレムII: アクロマ・マシーン, VS Kyuremu II; VS Kyurem II: Achroma Machine); 538. Therian Forme III (VSボルトロスれいじゅうフォルム: テリアン・フォーム, VS Borutorosu; VS Voltolos Sacred Beast Forme: Therian Forme); 539. Frozen World (VSランドロスれいじゅうフォルム: フローズン・ワールド, VS Randorosu; VS Landlos Sacred Beast Forme: Frozen World); 540. Flying Ship (VSバルジーナ: フライング・シップ, VS Barujīna; VS Vulgina: Flying Ship)
54	—	May 28, 2020; 978-4-09-142745-8; ISBN 978-4-09-943066-5 (limited edition)	April 13, 2021; 978-1-9747-2108-5
541. Pink Slip (VSメラルバ, VS Meraruba; VS Merlarva: Pink Slip); 542. N Returns (VSママンボウ, VS Mamanbō; VS Mamanbou: N Returns); 543. Abyssal Ruins (VSチョボマキ, VS Chobomaki; VS Chobomak: Abyssal Ruins); 544. Dream World (VSブラックキュレム, VS Burakku Kyuremu; VS Black Kyurem: Dream World); 545. Deduction Time (VSギギアル, VS Gigiaru; VS Gigiaru: Reasoning Time); 546. Giant Chasm (VSホワイトキュレム, VS Howaito Kyuremu; VS White Kyurem: Giant Hole)
55	—	May 28, 2020; 978-4-09-142746-5; ISBN 978-4-09-943067-2 (limited edition)	August 10, 2021; 978-1-9747-2109-2
547. The Final Battle: Crushed Ambition (最終決戦, The Last Battle; Crushed Ambition); 548. Epilogue: Graduation Ceremony (エピローグ, Epilogue; Graduation Ceremony); 549. An X-cuse to Come Out and Play (ガルーラ、待つ, Garūra, matsu; "Garūra, Wait") (Included in Volume 56 of Viz Media release); 550. X-actly What They Wanted (ガルーラ、化わる, Garūra, ka waru; "Garura, Change") (Included in Volume 56 of Viz Media release); 551. Inn-teresting Developments (ホルード、奪う, Horūdo, ubau; "Horudo, Seize") (Included in Volume 56 of Viz Media release); 552. They Have a Flare for a Li'l Kanga-Napping (ハリマロン、刺す, Harimaron, sasu; "Harimaron, Pierce") (Included in Volume 56 of Viz Media release)

==== X & Y chapter ====
No.	Title	Original release date	English release date
56	—	August 28, 2020; 978-4-09-143234-6	January 11, 2022; 978-1-9747-2585-4
553. Ninfia, mi miseru (ニンフィア、魅みせる) "Ninfia, Charm"; 554. Kangaskhan...Kangascan't (ガルーラ、試す, Garūra, sasu; "Garūra, Attempt"); 555. The Aegislash Agenda (ギルガルド、惑わす, Girugarudo, madowasu; "Gillguard, Bewilder"); 556. Lucky Lucario Was Here (ルカリオ、助ける, Rukario, tasukeru; "Lucario, Rescue"); 557. Onbatto, Samatageru (オンバット、妨さまたげる; "Onbatto, Hinder"); 558. What Does Charmander Do When It Dozes? (ヒトカゲ、まどろむ, Hitokage, madoromi; "Hitokage, Snooze"); 559. Chespin Sows the Seeds of Change (ハリマロン、起つ, Harimaron, tatsu; "Harimaron, Rise")
57	—	November 26, 2020; 978-4-09-143248-3	May 10, 2022; 978-1-9747-2663-9
560. Ōrotto, Tsuku (オーロット、突つく; "Ohrot, Strike"); 561. Herakurosu, kawaru (ヘラクロス、化かわる; "Heracros, Change"); 562. Pangoro Poses a Problem (ゴロンダ、探る, Goronda, saguru; "Goronda, Search"); 563. Charging After Electrike (ラクライ、追う, Rakurai, ou; "Rakurai, Pursue"); 564. Heigani, hasamu (ヘイガニ、はさむ; "Heigani, Nip"); 565. Fast-Thinking Froakie (ケロマツ、消える, Keromatsu, kieru; "Keromatsu, Disappear"); 566. Overthrowing a Tyrunt (チゴラス、砕く, Chigorasu, kudaku; "Chigoras, Crush")
58	—	February 26, 2021; 978-4-09-143277-3	September 13, 2022; 978-1-9747-2726-1
567. Morphing Manectric (ライボルト、化わる, Raiboruto, ka waru; "Raibolt, Change"); 568. Sānaito, tsūjiru (サーナイト、通つうじる; "Sirnight, Communicate"); 569. Dianshī, hikari hikaru (ディアンシー、光ひかる; "Diancie, Shine"); 570. Dancing Vivillon (ビビヨン、舞う, Viviyon, mau; "Vivillon, Dance"); 571. Burning Fletchinder (ヒノヤコマ、燃える, Hinoyakoma, moeru; "Hinoyakoma, Burn"); 572. Shooting Frogadier (ゲコガシラ、撃つ, Gekogashira, utsu; "Gekogahshier, Shoot"); 573. Gathering Klefki (クレッフィ、集める, Kleffi, atsumeru; "Cleffy, Collect")
59	—	May 28, 2021; 978-4-09-143308-4	January 10, 2023; 978-1-9747-2997-5
574. Tying Trevenant (オーロット、しばる, Oorotto, shibaru; "Ohrot, Bind"); 575. Changing Gengar (ゲンガー、化わる, Gengā, ka waru; "Gengar, Change"); 576. Surrounding Braixen (テールナー、囲う, Teerunā, kakou; "Tairenar, Surround"); 577. Quilladin Stands (ハリボーグ、立つ, Haribōgu, tatsu; "Hariborg, Stand"); 578. Gyarados Changes (ギャラドス、化わる, Gyaradosu, ka waru; "Gyarados, Change"); 579. Pyroar Breathes (カエンジシ、息吹く, Kaenjishi, ibuku; "Kaenjishi, Breathe"); 580. Flabébé Blooms (フラベベ、咲く, Furabebe, saku; "Flabébé, Bloom")
60	—	October 28, 2021; 4-09-143343-X	May 9, 2023; 978-1-9747-3460-3
581. Rhyhorn Charges (サイホーン、 突く, Saihoun, tsuku; "Sihorn, Strike"); 582. Pinsir Glares (カイロス、にらむ, Kairosu, niramu; "Kailios, Glare"); 583. Scizor Defend (ハッサム、受ける, Hassamu, ukeru; "Hassam, Catch"); 584. Hawlucha Attack (ルチャブル、襲う, Ruchaburu, osou; "Luchabull, Attack"); 585. Pinsir Changes (カイロス、化わる, Kairosu, ka waru; "Kailios, Change"); 586. Zygarde Appears (ジガルデ、現る, Jigarude, genru; "Zygarde, Appear"); 587. Malamar Traps (カラマネロ、仕掛ける, Karamanero, shikakeru; "Calamanera, Lay a Trap")
61	—	February 28, 2022; 978-4-09-143389-3	September 12, 2023; 978-1-9747-3640-9
588. Chesnaught Protects (ブリガロン、守る, Burigaron, mamoru; "Brigarron, Protect"); 589. Charizard Transforms (リザードン、化わる, Lizardon, ka waru; "Lizardon, Change"); 590. Yveltal Steals (イベルタル、奪う, Iberutaru, ubau; "Yveltal, Take"); 591. Mewtwo Angered (ミュウツー、怒る, Myūtsū, okoru; "Mewtwo, Get Enraged"); 592. Zygarde Agitated (ジガルデ、猛る, Jigarude, takeru; "Zygarde, Rage"); 593. Xerneas Gives (ゼルネアス、与える, Zeruneasu, ataeru; "Xerneas, Give"); 594. Epilogue (Epilogue, Epilogue; "Epilogue")

==== Omega Ruby & Alpha Sapphire chapter ====
No.	Title	Original release date	English release date
62	—	August 26, 2022; 978-4-09-143527-9	January 9, 2024
595. Magearna, Move (マギアナ、稼働く, Magiana, Kadō ku); 596. Metagross, Inspect (メタグロス、調べる, Metagurosu, Shiraberu); 597. Latias, Soar (ラティアス、飛ぶ, Ratiasu, Tobu); 598. Claydol, Sense (ネンドール、念じる, Nendōru, Nenjiru); 599. Salamence, Change (ボーマンダ、化わる, Bōmanda, Kawaru); 600. Gorebyss, Turn Vivid (サクラビス、色づく, Sakurabisu, Irodzuku); 601. Beedrill, Get Ready (スピアー、かまえる, Supiā, Kamaeru)
63	—	November 28, 2022; 978-4-09-143564-4	May 14, 2024
602. Hoopa, Warp (フーパ、ゆがめる, Fūpa, Yugameru); 603. Slowbro, Gleam (ヤドラン、ひらめく, Yadoran, Hirameku); 604. Goodra, Spit Up (ヌメルゴン、吐く, Numerugon, Haku); 605. Swampert, Strike (ラグラージ、たたく, Ragurāji, Tataku); 606. Diancie, Shine (ディアンシー、輝く, Dianshī, Kagayaku); 607. Blastoise, Change (カメックス、化わる, Kamekkusu, Kawaru); 608. Groudon, Return (グラードン、戻る, Gurādon, Modoru); 609. Kyogre, Return (カイオーガ、戻る, Kaiōga, Modoru)
64	—	February 28, 2023; 978-4-09-143585-9	—
610. Hoopa, Connect (フーパ、繋げる, Fūpa, Tsunageru); 611. Sawsbuck, Pierce Through (メブキジカ、貫く, Mebukijika, Tsuranuku); 612. Magnezone, Shoot (ジバコイル、撃つ, Jibakoiru, Utsu); 613. Tropius, Float (トロピウス、漂う, Toropiusu, Tadayou); 614. Swellow, Flap (オオスバメ、羽ばたく, Ōsubame, Habataku); 615. Noivern, Guide (オンバーン、導く, Onbān, Michibiku); 616. Gallade, Rend (エルレイド、切り裂く, Erureido, Kirisaku)

== Chapters not yet in tankōbon format ==
22 rounds in Omega Ruby & Alpha Sapphire chapter, 37 rounds in Sun, Moon, Ultra Sun & Ultra Moon chapter and 43 rounds in Sword & Shield chapter are yet to be published in a tankōbon volume, but have been printed in the magazine, mini volumes, or published online. These titles, and their order, are subject to change, both in collection into tankōbon, and translation into English.

=== Omega Ruby & Alpha Sapphire chapter ===
No.	Title	Original release date	English release date
1 1-2	—	July 24, 2015; 978-4-09-142037-4	September 6, 2016; December 6, 2016; 978-1-4215-9070-7; 978-1-4215-9016-5
000. Omega Alpha Adventure 0 (EPISODE 0); 001. Omega Alpha Adventure 1 (EPISODE 1); 002. Omega Alpha Adventure 2 (EPISODE 2); 003. Omega Alpha Adventure 3 (EPISODE 3); 004. Omega Alpha Adventure 4 (EPISODE 4); 005. Omega Alpha Adventure 5 (EPISODE 5); 006. Omega Alpha Adventure 6 (EPISODE 6); 007. Omega Alpha Adventure 7 (EPISODE 7)
2 3-4	—	February 26, 2016; 978-4-09-142137-1	March 7, 2017; July 4, 2017; 978-1-4215-9156-8; 978-1-4215-9223-7
008. Omega Alpha Adventure 8 (EPISODE 8); 009. Omega Alpha Adventure 9 (EPISODE 9); 010. Omega Alpha Adventure 10 (EPISODE 10); 011. Omega Alpha Adventure 11 (EPISODE 11); 012. Omega Alpha Adventure 12 (EPISODE 12); 013. Omega Alpha Adventure 13 (EPISODE 13); 014. Omega Alpha Adventure 14 (EPISODE 14)
3 5-6	—	September 28, 2016; 978-4-09-142235-4	November 7, 2017; March 6, 2018; 978-1-4215-9626-6; 978-1-4215-9738-6
015. Omega Alpha Adventure 15 (EPISODE 15); 016. Omega Alpha Adventure 16 (EPISODE 16); 017. Omega Alpha Adventure 17 (EPISODE 17); 018. Omega Alpha Adventure 18 (EPISODE 18); 019. Omega Alpha Adventure 19 (EPISODE 19); 020. Omega Alpha Adventure 20 (EPISODE 20); 021. Omega Alpha Adventure 21 (EPISODE 21)

=== Sun, Moon, Ultra Sun & Ultra Moon chapter ===
No.	Title	Original release date	English release date
1 1-2	—	June 23, 2017; 978-4-09-142407-5	May 8, 2018; September 11, 2018; 978-1-9747-0075-2; 978-1-9747-0130-8
001. The Grand Entrance and Delivery Boy Sun (登場！！運び屋サン！, Tōjō!! Hakobi ya San!; "He Appears!! Sun the Courier!"); 002. The Delivery of Rotom and the Girl (運搬！！ロトムと女の子！, Unpan!! Rotomu to onnanoko!; "Transport!! Rotom and the Girl!"); 003. Pokémon Move Specialist Professor Kukui (研究！！技の博士・ククイ！, Kenkyū!! Waza no hakase・Kukui!; "Research!! The Doctor of Moves - Kukui!"); 004. The Decision and the Tournament of Six (決定！！6人トーナメント！, Kettei!! Roku nin tōnamento!; "Decision!! 6-Person Tournament!"); 005. The Announcement and the Prize (発表！！ これが優勝商品！, Happyō!! Kore ga yūshō shōhin!; "Announcement!! This is the Grand Prize!!"); 006. The Party Crasher and Guzma the Destroyer (乱入！！ 破壊者グズマ！, Rannyū!! Hakai sha Guzuma!; "Intrusion!! Guzma the Destroyer!"); 007. The Final Match and a Surprising Finale! (決勝！！ 意外な結末！, Kesshō!! Igai na ketsumatsu!; "It's Decided!! An Unexpected Conclusion!")
2 3-4	—	December 27, 2017; 978-4-09-142596-6	January 8, 2019; May 14, 2019; 978-1-9747-0260-2; 978-1-9747-0305-0
008. Going Ashore and Neighboring Akala Island (上陸！！となりのアーカラじま！, Jōriku!! Tonari no ākara jima!; "Disembarking!! The Neighboring Akala Island!"); 009. True Identity and the Totem Pokémon of Brooklet Hill (正体！！せせらぎの丘のぬし！, Shōtai!! Seseragi no Oka no nushi!; "Identity!! The Leader of Brooklet Hill!"); 010. Defeat and the Commander of the School of Fish (攻略！！ぎょぐんの司令塔！, Kōryaku!! Giyogun no shirei tō!; "Capture!! The School's Leader!"); 011. Homecoming and the Brilliant Professional Golfer (帰還！！スゴ腕プロゴルファー！, Kikan!! Sugoude puro gorufā!; "Return!! The Remarkable Pro Golfer!"); 012. The Wild Full-Power Pose of Fire (乱舞！！炎のゼンリョクでポーズ！, Ranbu!! Honō no zenryoku de pōzu!; "Dance!! The Full-Powered Fire Pose!"); 013. Unleashing the Incredible Z-Move (発動！！驚異のZワザ！, Hatsudō!! Kyōi no zetto waza!; "Invoke!! The Tremendous Z-Move!")
3 5-6	—	June 22, 2018; 978-4-09-142739-7	September 10, 2019; January 14, 2020; 978-1-9747-0649-5; 978-1-9747-0794-2
014. Flash and Cosmog's Secret (一閃！！ほしぐもちゃんの秘密！, Issen!! Hoshigumo-chan no himitsu!; Flash!! Hoshigumo-chan's Secret!); 015. Shipwreck and "Oh, What Sharp Teeth You Have, Bruxish!" (難破！！歯ぎしりハギギシリ！, Nanpa!! Hagishiri hagigishiri!; Wreck!! Teeth-Grinding Hagigishiri!); 016. A Photoshoot and the Abandoned Thrifty Megamart (撮影！！メガやすの跡地！, Satsuei!! Mega yasu no atochi!; Photograph! The Abandoned Megacheap!); 017. A Raid and Po Town (突入！！ポータウン！, Totsunyū!! Pō taun!; Charge!! Po Town!); 018. Confusion and Monsters from Another World (乱戦！！異世界の怪物！, Ransen!! I sekai no kaibutsu!; Brawl!! The Monsters From A Different World!); 019. Truth and the Mastermind Behind Team Skull (真相！！スカル団の背後！, Shinsō!! Sukaru-dan no haigo!; Truth!! Behind the Curtains of Skull-dan!)
4 7-8	—	December 28, 2018; 978-4-09-142870-7	May 12, 2020; September 8, 2020; 978-1-9747-1115-4; 978-1-9747-1116-1
020. An Urgent Task and the Capture of an Ultra Beast (急務！！UB捕獲戦！, Kyūmu!! UB hokakusen!; Urgent!! The Battle to Capture the Ultra Beasts!); 021. Thieving and Boss Crabominable (強奪！！首領・ケケンカニ！, Gōdatsu! Shuryō kekenkani!; Ransack!! Kekenkani the Don!); 022. The Truth and Island Kahuna Hapu (誕生！！しまクイーンハプウ！, Tanjō! Shimakuīn hapuu!; Birth!! Island Queen Hāpuʻu!); 023. Battle in Vast Poni Canyon (対決！！ポニのだいきょうこく！, Taiketsu!! Poni no daikyōkoku!; Showdown!! The Great Canyon of Poni!); 024. Play the Melody That Echoes in the Altar (吹奏！！さいだんに響くメロディ！, Suisō!! Saidan ni hibiku merodi!; Play!! The Melody Reverberating at the Altar!); 025. Summon the Emissaries of the Moon and the Sun (出現！！月と太陽の化身！, Shutsugen!! Tsuki to taiyō no keshin!; Arrival!! The Incarnations of the Moon and Sun!)
5 9-10	—	June 28, 2019; 978-4-09-143030-4	January 12, 2021; May 11, 2021; 978-1-9747-1944-0; 978-1-9747-1945-7
026. Adventure in the Dark Dimension (探検！！闇の異世界！, Tanken!! Yami no i sekai!; Explore!! The Parallel World of Darkness!); 027. Meeting the Ultra Recon Squad (邂逅！！ウルトラ調査隊！, Kaigō!! Urutora chōsa-tai!; Encounter!! The Ultra Reconnaissance Team!); 028. Arrival at the Scientific Megalopolis (到着！！科学の巨大都市！, Tōchaku!! Kagaku no kyodai toshi!; Arrival!! The Megalopolis of Science!); 029. Darkness!! The Mysterious Claws of Necrozma! (漆黒！！謎のカギ爪ネクロズマ！, Shikkoku!! Nazo no kagi tsume nekurozuma!; Jet-Black!! The Mysterious Claws, Necrozma!); 030. Madness!! Mother Lusamine! (狂気！！母なるルザミーネ！, Kyōki!! Hahanaru ruzamīne!; Insane!! Mother Lusamine!); 031. Ray of Light!! Through the Crack in the Sky! (斜光！！空の裂け目から…！, Shakō!! Soranosakeme kara…!; Rays of Light!! From the Crack in the Sky...!)
6 11-12	—	December 27, 2019; 978-4-09-143158-5	September 14, 2021; January 11, 2022; 978-1-9747-2175-7; 978-1-9747-2176-4
032. Shock!! Father in the Pendant! (動揺！！ペンダントのとうさま！, Dōyō!! Pendanto no tō-sama!; Trembling!! The Father in the Pendant!); 033. Tyrant!! The Fiendish Man! (非道！！悪魔のような男！, Hidō!! Akuma no yōna otoko!; Immoral!! The Man like a Demon!); 034. Destroy!! Results of the Training! (撃破！！特訓の成果！, Gekiha!! Tokkun no seika!; Destroy!! The Results of Training!); 035. Chōetsu!! Urutoranekurozuma! (超越！！ウルトラネクロズマ！; Transcendence!! Ultra Necrozma!); 036. Saisei!! Taiyō to tsuki no chikara! (再生！！太陽と月の力！; Revival!! The Power of the Sun and Moon!); 037. Shūen!! I sekai to notatakai! (終焉！！異世界との戦い！; Conclusion!! The Battle with a Parallel World!)

=== Sword & Shield chapter ===
No.	Title	Original release date	English release date
1 1-2	—	June 26, 2020; 978-4-09-143217-9	August 10, 2021; December 14, 2021; 978-1-9747-2418-5; 978-1-9747-2525-0
001. Wow!! That's One Big Pokémon (ドキドキ！！でっかいポケモン, Pulse-pounding!! The Huge Pokémon); 002. Crackle!! Practice Battle (メリメリ！！練習バトル, Crackle!! Practice Battle); 003. Chomp!! Defeat Drednaw (ギリギリ！！カジリガメを倒せ, Gnash!! Defeat Drednaw); 004. Zap!! A Rising Beam of Light (ホワホワ！！あがる光柱, Float Softly!! Rising Pillar of Light); 005. Shine!! The Legendary Tools (ピカピカ！！伝説の身具); 006. Bustling!! Strong Rivals (ワラワラ！！強きライバル); 007. Fluttering!! The Match's End (バサバサ！！勝負に決着)
2 3-4	—	December 25, 2020; 4-09-143250-6	April 12, 2022; August 9, 2022; 978-1-9747-2645-5; 978-1-9747-2646-2
008. Steaming!! Showdown with Toxapex (ムンムン！！対決ドヒドイデ); 009. Overflowing!! Gigantamax Battle (ドバドバ！！キョダイマックスバトル); 010. Blaze!! Bede's Team (メラメラ！！ビートの手持ち); 011. Glug!! The Gulp Pokémon (ゴクゴク！！うのみポケモン); 012. Lumber!! The Overlooking Sage (ノシノシ！！見おろす賢者); 013. Sparkling!! The Vault's Tapestry (キラキラ！！宝物庫のタペストリー)
3 5-6	—	June 28, 2021; 978-4-09-143329-9	December 13, 2022; April 11, 2023; 978-1-9747-2656-1; 978-1-9747-2998-2
014. Misty-eyed!!The Master's Call (ウルウル！！師の呼び声); 015. Tingling!! Reunion at the Forest (ビリビリ！！森での再会); 016. Steadily!! Poplar of Arabesque (グングン！！アラベスクのポプラ); 017. Creak!! Infiltrate the Underground Plant (ギチギチ！！地下プラント潜入); 018. Chomp-Chomp!! That One is Uonoragon (ガブガブ！！あいつはウオノラゴン); 019. Crunch!! Battle in the Snow (ザクザク！！雪上のバトル)
4 7-8	–	January 28, 2022; 978-4-0914-3385-5	August 8, 2023; December 12, 2023; 978-1-9747-3638-6; 978-1-9747-3639-3
020. Crack!! A Gorgeous Tap Dance (パキパキ！！華麗のタップダンス); 021. Flicker!! The Figure in the Memory (ユラユラ！！ 記憶の影); 022. Grind!! The High-Class Kidnappers (キリキリ！！高貴な誘拐犯); 023. Scrape!! Confrontation with the Celebrities (ゴリゴリ！！セレブといざ対面); 024. Shatter!! The Shocking Truth (メキメキ！！衝撃の真相); 025. Menacing!! The Terrifing Black Night (ゴゴゴゴ！！恐怖のブラックナイト)
5 9-10	–	July 28, 2022; 978-4-0914-3534-7	April 4, 2024; August 13, 2024; 978-1-9747-4344-5; 978-1-9747-4393-3
026. Crack!! The Rusted Sword and Shield (バキバキ！！くちた剣と盾); 027. Sting!! The Chairman's Plan (ヒリヒリ！！委員長の計画); 028. Splash!! Those Two Have Returned (ザブザブ！！帰ってきた2匹); 029. Rumble!! The Tools Won't Turn Back (ググググ！！戻せない身具); 030. Shine!! The Disappearing Sōdo (テレテレ！！消えた創人); 031. Flutter!! Pass to a New Land (ピラピラ！！新天地への切符)
6 11-12	–	January 27, 2023; 978-4-0914-3576-7	December 10, 2024; April 8, 2025; 978-1-9747-4712-2; 978-1-9747-4713-9
032. Relentless!! Another Encounter in the New Land (ビシビシ！！新天地での再会); 033. Whoosh!! Off to the Forest of Focus (ギュンギュン！！いざ集中の森へ); 034. Crackle!! The Trio's Great Evolution (メキメキ！！3匹大進化); 035. Boom!! Dakuma and Great Training (ボムボム！！ダクマと超修業); 036. Rumble!! Serious Tower Showdown (ドドドド！！本気の塔対決); 037. Scratch!! Take Back the Sword and Shield (バリバリ！！剣・盾を取り戻せ)
7 13-14	–	July 28, 2023; 978-4-0914-3576-7	August 12, 2025; December 9, 2025; 978-1-9747-5458-8; 978-1-9747-5578-3
038. Crownow!! The Secret Carrot (カムカム！！ひみつのにんじん); 039. Clip-clop!! The King's Beloved Steed (パカパカ！！王の愛馬); 040. Rumble!! The Black Night Once Again (ゴロゴロ！！ブラックナイト再び); 041. Snap!! Ultimate Form (パシパシ！！最強形態); 042. Rapid Fire!! Triple All-Out Assault (ダダダダ！！トリプル大進撃); 043. Drifting!! Farewell Galar (ホワホワ！！さよならガラル)

=== Scarlet & Violet chapter ===
No.	Title	Original release date	English release date
1 1-2	–	February 28, 2024; 978-4-0914-3692-4	February 11, 2025; June 10 2025; 978-1-9747-5284-3; 978-1-9747-5503-5
001. Sprint! Paldea's Prince of Speed!! (疾しっ走そう！パルデアの最速スピード王おう子じ！!); 002. Discovery! Quaking Earth Leader!! (発見！土震のヌシ！！); 003. Showdown! Delinquent Team Star!! (対決！不良のスター団！！); 004. Charge! Dark Crew Base!! (突入！あく組のアジト！!); 005. Victory! DJ Piña!! (勝負！ＤＪ・ピーニャ！!); 006. Skillful! Mysterious Treasure Hunter!! (巧者！謎のトレジャーハンター！！)
2 3-4	–	September 27, 2024; 978-4-0914-9784-0	October 14, 2025; February 10, 2026; 978-1-9747-5863-0; 978-1-9747-6211-8
007. Fierce Fight! The Stony Cliff Leader!! (激戦！完璧のヌシ！！); 008. Acquired! New Ability Dash!! (習得！新能力ダッシュ！！); 009. Challenge! The Avant-garde Man!! (挑戦！アヴァンギャルドな男！！); 010. Evolution! Flame's Second Stage!! (進化！炎の第２形態！！); 011. Conclusion! Battle with the Open Sky!! (決着！大空の戦い！！); 012. Live Stream! Donnamonja TV!! (配信！ドンナモンジャTV！！)
3 5-6	–	March 28, 2025; 978-4-0915-4021-8	June 9, 2026; October 13, 2026; 978-1-9747-6353-5; 978-1-9747-6535-5
013. Calamity! The Requesting Raifort!! (災厄！依頼者レホール！！); 014. Robbery! The Aim is Miraidon!! (強奪！狙いはミライドン！！); 015. Charge! The Second Hideout!! (突撃！ふたつ目のアジト！！); 016. Powerful! Flame Warrior Meloco!! (強力！炎の戦士メロコ！！); 017. Emergence! Lurking Steel Titan!! (出現！潜鋼のヌシ！！); 018. Acquisition! Secret Salt Spice!! (獲得！秘伝のしおスパイス！！)

== Mini-volumes ==
Due to several hiatuses in the development of the Black 2/White 2 arc (beginning in 2013 and not concluding until 2020), publication of the tankōbon volumes went on a hiatus. In response, Viz released mini-volumes of the arcs from X/Y onwards. These were half the length (ranging from 2-4 chapters compared to 6-12 chapters in the tankōbons) and released more frequently. 12 mini-volumes were released for the X/Y, Sun/Moon, and Sword/Shield arcs, and 6 mini-volumes of the Omega Ruby/Alpha Sapphire arc were released as well. Tankōbon volumes of the X/Y arc would be published in America in early 2022.
