= List of Pokémon Adventures volumes =

Pokémon Adventures, known in Japan as Pocket Monsters Special (ポケットモンスター SPECIAL, Poketto Monsutā SPECIAL), is a Japanese manga series published by Shogakukan. The story arcs of the series are based on most of the Pokémon video games released by Nintendo and, as such, the main characters of the series have the name of their video game. Since the manga is based on the video games, there are some delays with the serialization since the authors need to have seen the games in order to continue with the plot.

== Overview ==
The series is written by Hidenori Kusaka. It was illustrated by Mato during the first nine volumes, while Satoshi Yamamoto started illustrating it since the tenth volume. The Japanese publisher Shogakukan has been releasing the individual chapters in tankōbon format with the first one being released on August 8, 1997, and currently, 64 tankōbon have been released.

The distributing company Viz Media has licensed the series for English in the United States. Viz released the first seven volumes of the series in tankōbon format from July 6, 2000 to January 2003 as well as in magazine format. During 2006 they released two volumes with the name The Best of Pokémon Adventures, which are various chapters from the first two arcs put into one book. On June 1, 2009, Viz restarted publishing the tankōbon volumes, and also localized the later arcs after the first 7 volumes. Volume 8, the start of the Gold and Silver arc, released in 2010, and Volume 30, the start of the DP arc (known as volume 1 of Diamond/Pearl/Platinum in Viz's release) was released in 2011. However, these releases feature both visual and dialogue edits not found in the original English release and original Japanese tankobon release.

On July 24, 2018, Viz announced their plans to release the regular volume releases digitally on their digital platform, as well as the digital platforms of their associates such as ComiXology and Amazon Kindle with the first seven volumes available initially and the remaining sagas planned for release between August and December 2018.

== Volume list ==
=== Volumes 1–20 ===
==== Red, Green & Blue ====
No.	Title	Original release date	English release date
1	Desperado Pikachu	August 8, 1997; 4-09-149331-9	July 6, 2000; 978-1-56931-507-1
2	Legendary Pokémon	December 16, 1997; 4-09-149332-7	December 6, 2000; 978-1-56931-508-8
3	Saffron City Siege	May 28, 1998; 4-09-149333-5	August 5, 2001; 978-1-56931-560-6

==== Yellow chapter ====
No.	Title	Original release date	English release date
4	The Yellow Caballero: A Trainer in Yellow	December 16, 1998; 4-09-149334-3	January 9, 2002; 978-1-56931-710-5
5	The Yellow Caballero: Making Waves	April 26, 1999; 4-09-149335-1	January 9, 2002; 978-1-56931-563-7
6	The Yellow Caballero: The Cave Campaign	November 27, 1999; 4-09-149336-X	September 5, 2002; 978-1-59116-028-1
7	The Yellow Caballero: The Pokémon Elite	April 26, 2000; 4-09-149336-X	January 2003; 978-1-4215-3060-4

==== Gold, Silver & Crystal chapter ====
No.	Title	Original release date	English release date
8	—	August 8, 2001; 4-09-149338-6	August 3, 2010; 978-1-4215-3061-1
9	—	August 8, 2001; 4-09-149339-4	October 5, 2010; 978-1-4215-3062-8
10	—	August 8, 2001; 4-09-149340-8	December 7, 2010; 978-1-4215-3063-5
11	—	December 25, 2001; 4-09-149711-X	February 1, 2011; 978-1-4215-3545-6
12	—	April 26, 2002; 4-09-149712-8	April 5, 2011; 978-1-4215-3546-3
13	—	August 28, 2002; 4-09-149713-6	June 7, 2011; 978-1-4215-3547-0
14	—	January 28, 2003; 4-09-149714-4	August 2, 2011; 978-1-4215-3548-7

==== Ruby & Sapphire chapter ====
No.	Title	Original release date	English release date
15	—	July 28, 2003; 4-09-149715-2	March 5, 2013; 978-1-4215-3549-4
16	From Dewford to Slateport; From Dewford to Slateport (ムロからカイナヘ)	October 28, 2003; 4-09-149716-0	May 7, 2013; 978-1-4215-3550-0
17	Battle of Father and Son; Battle of the Parent-Child (親子の戦い)	February 28, 2004; 4-09-149717-9	July 2, 2013; 978-1-4215-3551-7
18	The Warriors Gather; The Gathering of the Warriors (戦士の集合)	June 19, 2004; 4-09-149718-7	September 3, 2013; 978-1-4215-3552-4
19	Fighting the Evil; Fighting the Evil (巨悪共闘)	October 28, 2004; 4-09-149719-5	November 5, 2013; 978-1-4215-3553-1
20	The Third Journey; The Third Journey (第3の旅立ち)	April 26, 2005; 4-09-149720-9	January 7, 2014; 978-1-4215-3554-8

=== Volumes 21–40 ===
==== Ruby & Sapphire chapter ====
No.	Title	Original release date	English release date
21	I Want to Let Him Know; I Want to Tell Him (あの人に伝えたい)	December 24, 2005; 4-09-140096-5	March 4, 2014; 978-1-4215-3555-5
22	Land, Sea and Sky; Land, Sea and Sky (陸と海と天空と)	August 28, 2006; 4-09-140228-3	May 6, 2014; 978-1-4215-3556-2

==== FireRed & LeafGreen chapter ====
No.	Title	Original release date	English release date
23	— Fierce Fighting in the Sevii Islands (ナナシマでの激闘)	October 27, 2006; 4-09-140254-2	July 1, 2014; 978-1-4215-3557-9
24	— Defeat and Frustration (敗北と挫折)	January 26, 2007; 978-4-09-140318-6	September 2, 2014; 978-1-4215-3558-6
25	— Showdown at the Peak (頂上対決)	March 28, 2007; 978-4-09-140329-2	November 4, 2014; 978-1-4215-3559-3

==== Emerald chapter ====
No.	Title	Original release date	English release date
26	— Dazzling Frontier (まばゆきフロンティア)	June 23, 2007; 978-4-09-140366-7	January 6, 2015; 978-1-4215-3560-9
27	Awakening of the Millennium; Awakening of the Millennium (千年の目覚め)	August 28, 2007; 978-4-09-140398-8	March 3, 2015; 978-1-4215-3561-6
28	The Stolen Wishing Star; The Stolen Wishing Star (奪わるる願い星)	December 25, 2007; 978-4-09-140456-5	May 5, 2015; 978-1-4215-3562-3
29	Assembly of the Ten; Gathering of the Ten (10人の集結)	November 27, 2008; 978-4-09-140743-6	July 7, 2015; 978-1-4215-3563-0

==== Diamond & Pearl chapter ====
No.	Title	Original release date	English release date
30	Onwards to Sinnoh...! To the Shin'ō Region...! (シンオウ地方へ...！！)	December 25, 2008; 978-4-09-140770-2	March 1, 2011; 978-1-4215-3816-7
31	Team Galactic Moves Out; The Galaxey Gang Moves Out (動きだすギンガ)	March 27, 2009; 978-4-09-140799-3	June 7, 2011; 978-1-4215-3817-4
32	The Real Bodyguards; The Real Bodyguards (本物の護衛)	June 19, 2009; 978-4-09-140839-6	October 4, 2011; 978-1-4215-3818-1
33	Attack on Celestic; Attack on Kannagi (カンナギ襲撃)	October 28, 2009; 978-4-09-140868-6	February 7, 2012; 978-1-4215-3912-6
34	The Revealed Truth; The Truth is Revealed (明かされる真実)	February 26, 2010; 978-4-09-140887-7	June 5, 2012; 978-1-4215-3913-3
35	Legendary Beat; The Beat of Legends (伝説の鼓動)	May 28, 2010; 978-4-09-141057-3	October 2, 2012; 978-1-4215-3914-0
36	Enter the Galactic Bomb; The Galaxy Bomb Drops (ギンガ爆弾投下)	August 27, 2010; 978-4-09-141118-1	February 5, 2013; 978-1-4215-4247-8
37	— Gather to the Place of the Decisive Battle (集結決戦の地へ)	November 26, 2010; 978-4-09-141207-2	June 4, 2013; 978-1-4215-5404-4

==== Platinum chapter ====
No.	Title	Original release date	English release date
38	The Other Side of This World; The Other Side of the World (この世の裏側)	February 28, 2011; 978-4-09-141208-9	October 1, 2013; 978-1-4215-5405-1
39	Renegade Dragon; Renegade Dragon (叛骨のドラゴン)	July 28, 2011; 978-4-09-141314-7	February 4, 2014; 978-1-4215-5406-8
40	Legends and Myths! Legends! Phantoms!! (伝説！幻！！)	May 28, 2012; 978-4-09-141468-7	June 3, 2014; 978-1-4215-6179-0

=== Volumes 41–current ===
==== HeartGold & SoulSilver chapter ====
No.	Title	Original release date	English release date
41	Johto Again; Jōto Again (ジョウト再び！)	June 28, 2012; 978-4-09-141497-7	August 6, 2013; 978-1-4215-5900-1
42	The Battle of the Mystri Stage (VIZ Media)/Mystri Stage Battle (Shogakukan Asia); Battle of the Triad Stage (三つ舞台の攻防)	October 26, 2012; 978-4-09-141497-7	October 29, 2013; 978-1-4215-5901-8

==== Black & White chapter ====
No.	Title	Original release date	English release date
43	The Blessing of Happiness (VIZ Media)/Happiness and Blessing (Shogakukan Asia); Happiness Blessing (幸せ 祝福)	January 25, 2013; 978-4-09-141583-7	July 2, 2013; 978-1-4215-5898-1
44	—	March 28, 2013; 978-4-09-141644-5	November 5, 2013; 978-1-4215-5899-8
45	—	June 28, 2013; 978-4-09-141684-1	March 4, 2014; 978-1-4215-6178-3
46	—	July 26, 2013; 978-4-09-141688-9	July 1, 2014; 978-1-4215-6180-6
47	—	August 24, 2013; 978-4-09-141587-5	November 4, 2014; 978-1-4215-6181-3
48	—	November 28, 2013; 978-4-09-141625-4	March 3, 2015; 978-1-4215-7181-2
49	—	January 25, 2014; 978-4-09-141699-5	April 7, 2015; 978-1-4215-7836-1
50	—	March 25, 2014; 978-4-09-141708-4	July 7, 2015; 978-1-4215-7837-8
51	—	July 25, 2014; 978-4-09-141809-8	October 6, 2015; 978-1-4215-7961-0

==== Black 2 & White 2 chapter ====
No.	Title	Original release date	English release date
52	—	December 26, 2014; 978-4-09-141894-4	January 3, 2017; 978-1-4215-8437-9
53	—	August 8, 2017; 978-4-09-142412-9	July 10, 2018; 978-1-4215-8438-6
54	—	May 28, 2020; 978-4-09-142745-8; ISBN 978-4-09-943066-5 (limited edition)	April 13, 2021; 978-1-9747-2108-5
55	—	May 28, 2020; 978-4-09-142746-5; ISBN 978-4-09-943067-2 (limited edition)	August 10, 2021; 978-1-9747-2109-2

==== X & Y chapter ====
No.	Title	Original release date	English release date
56	—	August 28, 2020; 978-4-09-143234-6	January 11, 2022; 978-1-9747-2585-4
57	—	November 26, 2020; 978-4-09-143248-3	May 10, 2022; 978-1-9747-2663-9
58	—	February 26, 2021; 978-4-09-143277-3	September 13, 2022; 978-1-9747-2726-1
59	—	May 28, 2021; 978-4-09-143308-4	January 10, 2023; 978-1-9747-2997-5
60	—	October 28, 2021; 4-09-143343-X	May 9, 2023; 978-1-9747-3460-3
61	—	February 28, 2022; 978-4-09-143389-3	September 12, 2023; 978-1-9747-3640-9

==== Omega Ruby & Alpha Sapphire chapter ====
No.	Title	Original release date	English release date
62	—	August 26, 2022; 978-4-09-143527-9	January 9, 2024
63	—	November 28, 2022; 978-4-09-143564-4	May 14, 2024
64	—	February 28, 2023; 978-4-09-143585-9	—

22 rounds in Omega Ruby & Alpha Sapphire chapter, 37 rounds in Sun, Moon, Ultra Sun & Ultra Moon chapter and 43 rounds in Sword & Shield chapter are yet to be published in a tankōbon volume, but have been printed in the magazine, mini volumes, or published online. These titles, and their order, are subject to change, both in collection into tankōbon, and translation into English.

=== Omega Ruby & Alpha Sapphire chapter ===
No.	Title	Original release date	English release date
1 1-2	—	July 24, 2015; 978-4-09-142037-4	September 6, 2016; December 6, 2016; 978-1-4215-9070-7; 978-1-4215-9016-5
2 3-4	—	February 26, 2016; 978-4-09-142137-1	March 7, 2017; July 4, 2017; 978-1-4215-9156-8; 978-1-4215-9223-7
3 5-6	—	September 28, 2016; 978-4-09-142235-4	November 7, 2017; March 6, 2018; 978-1-4215-9626-6; 978-1-4215-9738-6

=== Sun, Moon, Ultra Sun & Ultra Moon chapter ===
No.	Title	Original release date	English release date
1 1-2	—	June 23, 2017; 978-4-09-142407-5	May 8, 2018; September 11, 2018; 978-1-9747-0075-2; 978-1-9747-0130-8
2 3-4	—	December 27, 2017; 978-4-09-142596-6	January 8, 2019; May 14, 2019; 978-1-9747-0260-2; 978-1-9747-0305-0
3 5-6	—	June 22, 2018; 978-4-09-142739-7	September 10, 2019; January 14, 2020; 978-1-9747-0649-5; 978-1-9747-0794-2
4 7-8	—	December 28, 2018; 978-4-09-142870-7	May 12, 2020; September 8, 2020; 978-1-9747-1115-4; 978-1-9747-1116-1
5 9-10	—	June 28, 2019; 978-4-09-143030-4	January 12, 2021; May 11, 2021; 978-1-9747-1944-0; 978-1-9747-1945-7
6 11-12	—	December 27, 2019; 978-4-09-143158-5	September 14, 2021; January 11, 2022; 978-1-9747-2175-7; 978-1-9747-2176-4

=== Sword & Shield chapter ===
No.	Title	Original release date	English release date
1 1-2	—	June 26, 2020; 978-4-09-143217-9	August 10, 2021; December 14, 2021; 978-1-9747-2418-5; 978-1-9747-2525-0
2 3-4	—	December 25, 2020; 4-09-143250-6	April 12, 2022; August 9, 2022; 978-1-9747-2645-5; 978-1-9747-2646-2
3 5-6	—	June 28, 2021; 978-4-09-143329-9	—
