= Coldwater fish =

Fish that prefer cooler water temperatures

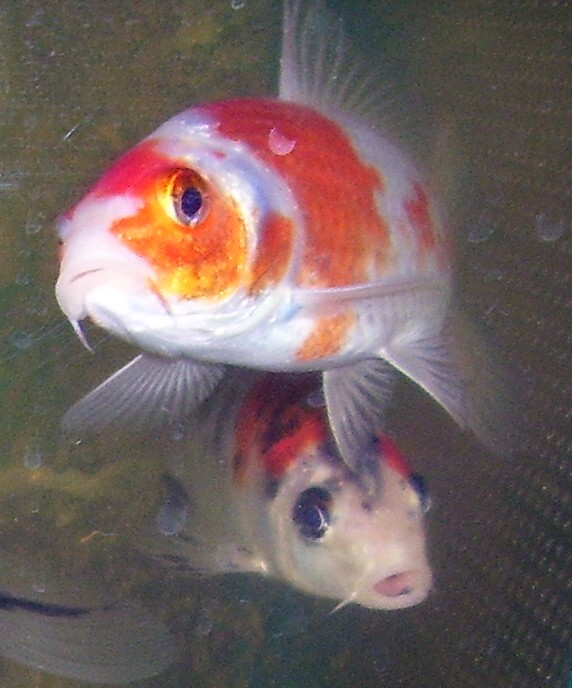
Japanese koi carp are coldwater fish.

The term coldwater fish can have different meanings in different contexts.

- In the context of fishkeeping, it refers to ornamental fish species that tolerate the temperatures of a typical indoor aquarium well and do not require a heater to remain active, as opposed to tropical fish, which need a heater to survive in the room temperatures of temperate climates;
- In the context of ecology and fishing, it refers to fish species that prefer to inhabit waterbodies or depth zones with much lower temperatures than the average temperate water. Salmonids (e.g. salmon, trout, char and graylings) are a classic example of such types of fish.

== Fishkeeping ==
Most or all ornamental fish species are able to tolerate temperatures as low as or lower than room temperature, with most stenothermic tropical species having critical thermal minimums of around 10-12 °C. Although these fish are capable of surviving in unheated aquaria, their temperature preferences may vary. For example, koi, goldfish, and pond loaches are commonly considered to be cold-water fish because of their ability to survive at very low temperatures, but their temperature preferences and/or physiological optimal temperatures are 32 °C (90 °F), 24–31 °C (75–88 °F), and 26–28 °C (79–82 °F), respectively. Because many of the ornamental fish considered to be “coldwater fish” are more accurately eurythermal fish and many prefer temperatures similar to, or even warmer than those preferred by certain tropical fish, the term “coldwater fish” in the aquarium context often misleads pet owners into keeping fish below their preferred temperature.

=== Freshwater aquarium fish ===
- Southern redbelly dace
- Lepomis
- Shubunkin
- Comet goldfish
- Common goldfish
- Fancy goldfish
- Black telescope
- Fantail goldfish
- Oranda
- Ryukin
- Weather loach
- White Cloud Mountain minnow
- Celestial Pearl Danio
- Buenos Aires tetra
- Gold barb
- Rosy barb
- Odessa barb
- Fathead minnow
- Banded corydoras
- Chinese high fin banded shark
- Three-spined stickleback
- Ticto barb
- Pygmy sunfish
- Enneacanthus
- Texas cichlid
- Paradise fish
- Green barb
- Zebra danio
- Bengal danio
- Leopard danio
- Danio tinwini
- Bulldog pleco
- Rhinogobius
- Desert goby
- Highland swordtail (Xiphophorus malinche)
- Japanese ricefish
- Zacco
- Black lined loach (Yasuhikotakia nigrolineata)
- Red shiner (Cyprinella lutrensis)
- Spotted gar
- Longnose gar
- Rosy red minnow
- Hillstream loach
- Spined loach
- Stone loach
- Common minnow
- Vietnamese cardinal minnow
- GM glowing medaka
- Gobio
- Amur bitterling
- Rosy bitterling
- Light's bitterling
- Deep bodied bitterling
- Rainbow shiner (Notropsis chromosus)
- Black shark (not to be confused with the tropical red tailed black shark)
- Golden cobra snakehead
- Dwarf snakehead
- Rainbow snakehead
- Spotted snakehead (Channa punctata)
- Pearl danio
- Northern snakehead
- Chinese algae eater
- Variable platyfish

Note: The above contains a mix of true coldwater fish and sub-tropical fish that can survive and thrive at room temperature which ranges from 15 °C (59 °F) and to 30 °C (86 °F).

=== Freshwater pond fish ===
- Three-spined stickleback
- Nine-spined stickleback
- Common goldfish
- Comet goldfish
- Shubunkin
- Sterlet
- Koi
- Golden orfe
- Blue orfe
- Bitterling
- Gobio
- Grass carp
- Albino grass carp
- Fathead minnow
- Rosy red minnow
- Mirror carp
- Common carp
- Golden rudd
- Green tench
- Golden tench
- Channel catfish
- Golden rainbow trout
- Roach
- Bluegill
- Pumpkinseed
- Weather loach
- Stone loach
- Spined loach
- Common minnow

=== Saltwater aquarium fish ===
- Garibaldi
- Catalina goby
- Zebra Catalina goby (Lythrypnus zebra)
- Ornate boxfish
- Shaw's boxfish
- White bar boxfish
- Truncate coralfish
- Blue devil
- Pot bellied seahorses

== Wild fisheries ==
The term "coldwater" is also used to refer to wild fish species that prefer bodies of water that are colder than most temperate waters. In recreational fishing, anglers may loosely break down fish into categories of warm-water fish, cool-water fish, and cold-water fish. Warm-water fish, such as largemouth bass, sunfish and bullhead catfish, are species that tend to dwell in relatively warm tropical and temperate waters similar to the room temperatures that humans easily find comfortable. Cool-water species, such as smallmouth bass and walleye, can tolerate a wide range of temperatures, but tend to be most abundant in cooler rivers or deeper parts of ponds and lakes, where the temperature is slightly lower than room temperatures. Cold-water species, such as salmonids (e.g. salmon, trout, char, graylings, freshwater whitefishes, etc.) and gadiforms (cods, hakes, pollock, haddock, burbot and rocklings, etc.), however become stressed at warm temperatures and are most active in colder temperatures around 7–18 °C (45–65 °F) which resemble a more subarctic or alpine condition. Because these designations are informal, different fisheries management authorities may recognize different boundaries in temperature preference between the categories.

== See also ==
- List of freshwater aquarium fish species
