= Jikin =

Japanese goldfish variety

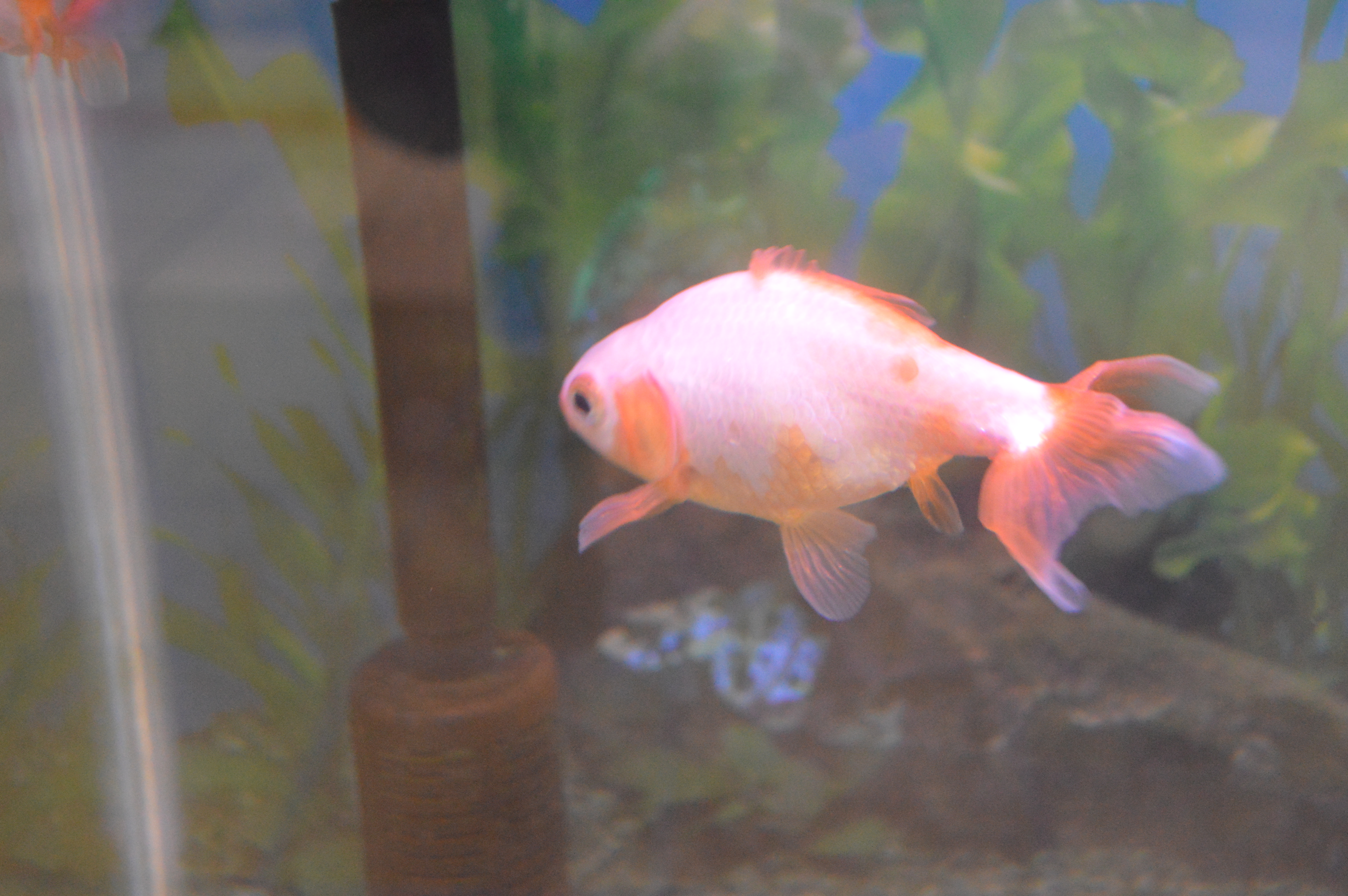
- Jikin goldfish in a tank
- Country of origin: Japan
- Type: Streamlined/Intermediate

Classification
- BAS

The jikin (地金), also known as the peacock tail goldfish, is a breed of wakin-like goldfish developed in Japan.

== Description ==
Jikin have a similar body shape as a wakin or a ryukin, but with a compressed, wide-angled tail that looks like the letter X when viewed from behind.

In addition other ubiquitous color variations (from red, white, and orange), jikin also have a desired pattern called rokurin, or 'Twelve Points of Red' (TPoR). Rokurin is a type of pattern commonly displayed in jikin because in Japan, the fish are often applied in the process by scraping off the red areas of the scales and face of young individuals. This practice is not used elsewhere. Jikin offspring may produce TPoR naturally to reduce that practice.

The rokurin pattern has red point/s displayed at the following parts:

- Lip
- Caudal fin (pair)
- Dorsal fin
- Pelvic fins (pair)
- Pectoral fins (pair)
- Anal fins (pair)
- Gill covers, or operculum (pair)

Aside from the red coloration, most of the jikin's body is white.

Jikin may also be called 'rokurin'.

== Availability ==
Jikins are rarely found outside Japan, and are more expensive than the fairly common wakin.

== History ==
The jikin was bred from the wakin during the Muromachi era. The tail spread apart and the body became slightly shorter. There was an old inscription regarding the creation of the pattern of this goldfish (by adding plum oil, or removing the scales with a small spatula), now refers to as the points of red.

== Other breeds ==
Jikins are rarely crossbred. The jikin breeds are:

- The Kumanomi goldfish (クマノミ金魚, Kumanomi kingyo), also called the anemonefish goldfish, is an exquisite breed of goldfish only located in Japan. Its origins are less known due to its circumstances being unrecognized, but it is assumed to be a cross of Bristol shubunkin and Jikin. The name suggests the red body with white perpendicular stripes creates a clownfish-like appearance. Like jikins, artificial pattering is also used in kumanomi for stripes.
- Tokai Nishiki is a rare breed, created by crossing a jikin with a choubi (butterfly telescope). The result is a long flowing body with long broad fins, and either an X-shaped or butterfly-shaped tail.
- Aurora is a rare breed of goldfish from Japan mixed from a jikin and a Bristol shubunkin. Although both hybrid goldfish breeds originate from the same varieties, accordingly, while kumanomi is a single tailed, aurora is a double tailed.
- Sanshu Nishiki is a goldfish crossed from a ranchu and a jikin.
- Yanishiki is a Japanese goldfish originated from crossbreeding jikin and Bristol shubunkin. It is confusingly compared with the aurora, only a least known difference are the caudal fin angle and shape.
