= Pearlscale =

Goldfish breed

Pearlscale goldfish
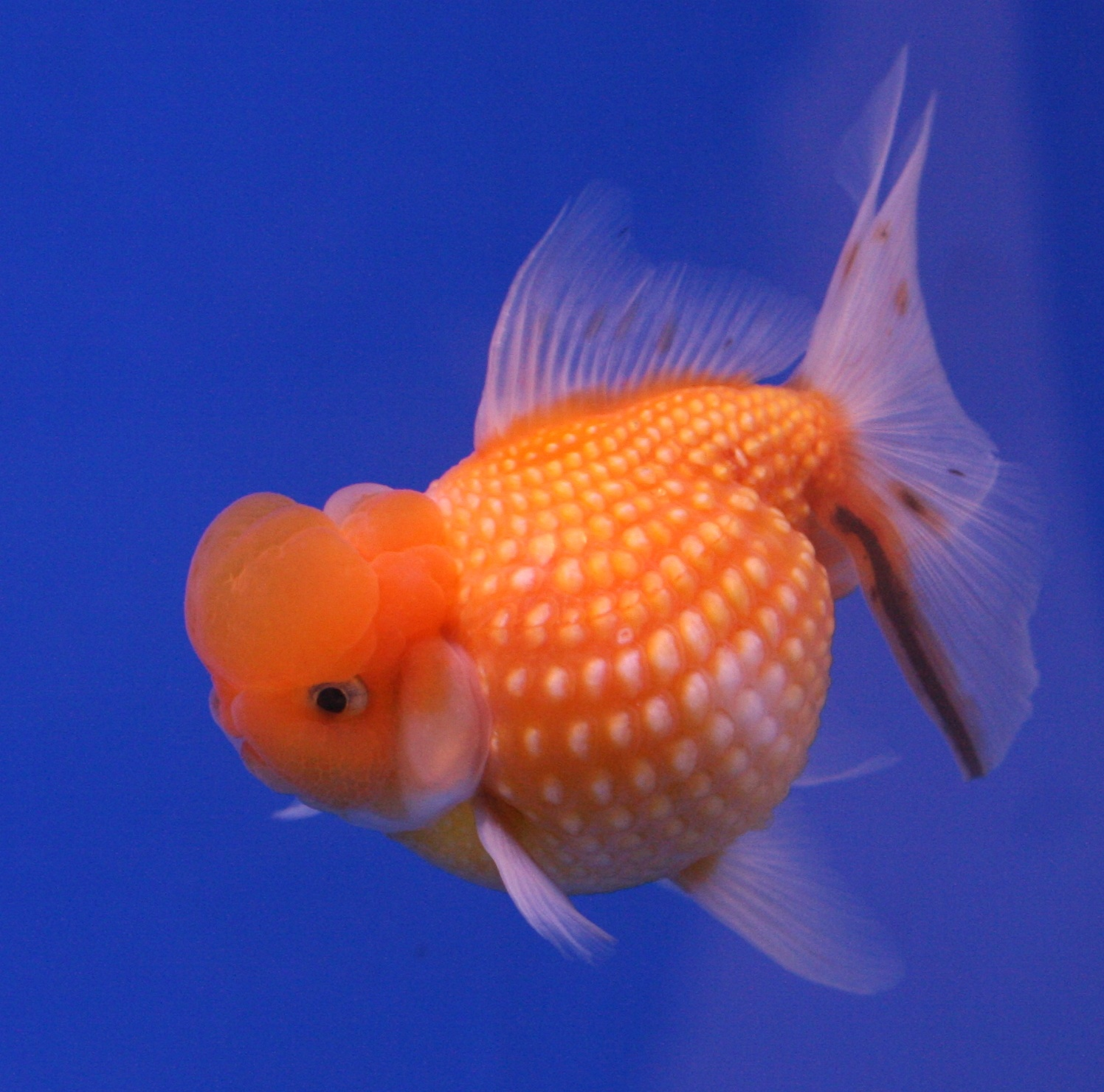
- Country of origin: China and Japan
- Type: Fantailed

Classification
- BAS

The Pearlscale or Chinshurin (珍珠鱗) in Japanese is a spherical-bodied fancy goldfish with doubled finnage similar to the fantail.

== Description ==
The characteristic feature of the Pearlscale is its thick, domed scales with pearl-like appearance. Its body is round and similar to a golf ball. The finnage may be long or short. Pearlscales can reach up to 8 inches (20 cm) long and grow up as large as an orange. Pearlscale goldfish are susceptible to swimbladder disorders which affect the ability to maintain normal position in the water. This is attributed to the selective breeding process of fancy goldfish to achieve particular body forms, such as that of the Pearlscale's roundness, which results in the alteration of the appearance of the shape and function of the swimbladder. The Pearlscale is also known as the Ping Pong Pearlscale and Golfball Pearlscale.

=== Breed standard ===
The Pearlscale standard is as follows:

- Depth of body to be greater than 2/3 of body length
- Scales to be domed
- Dorsal fin to be single, all other fins to be paired
- Caudal fin to be divided and forked and held above the horizontal
- Extremities of fins to have a slightly rounded appearance
- Minimum length of body to be 5.5 cm (2¼ inches)

The fish should be bright and alert and displaying well developed domed scales all over the body area. The body should be short and rounded (not elongated). The caudal fin should be held high without signs of drooping and well divided. Quality fish will have high color intensity extending into the fins.

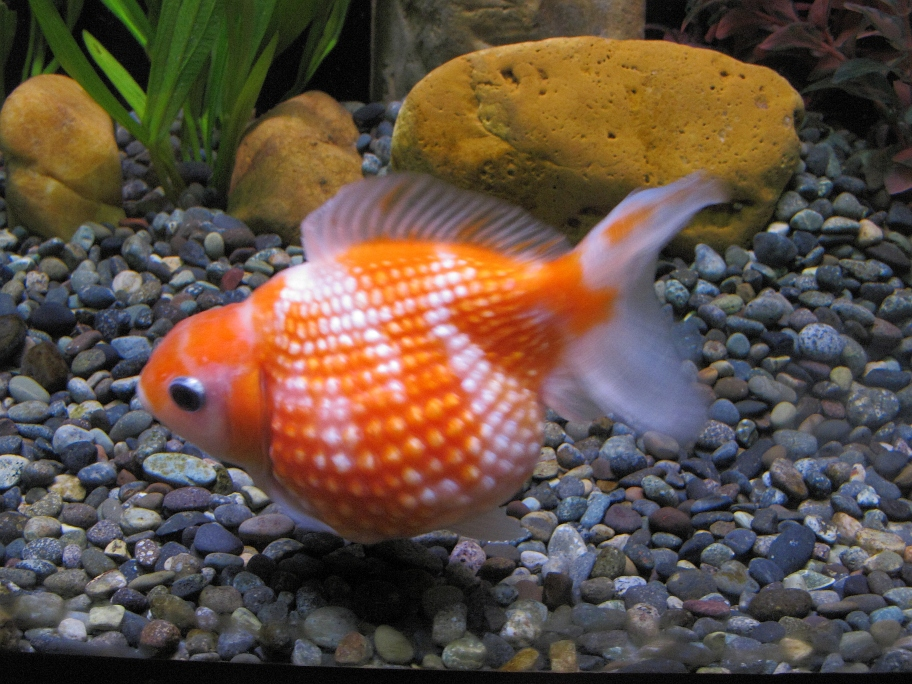
Orange and white fancy Pearlscale goldfish

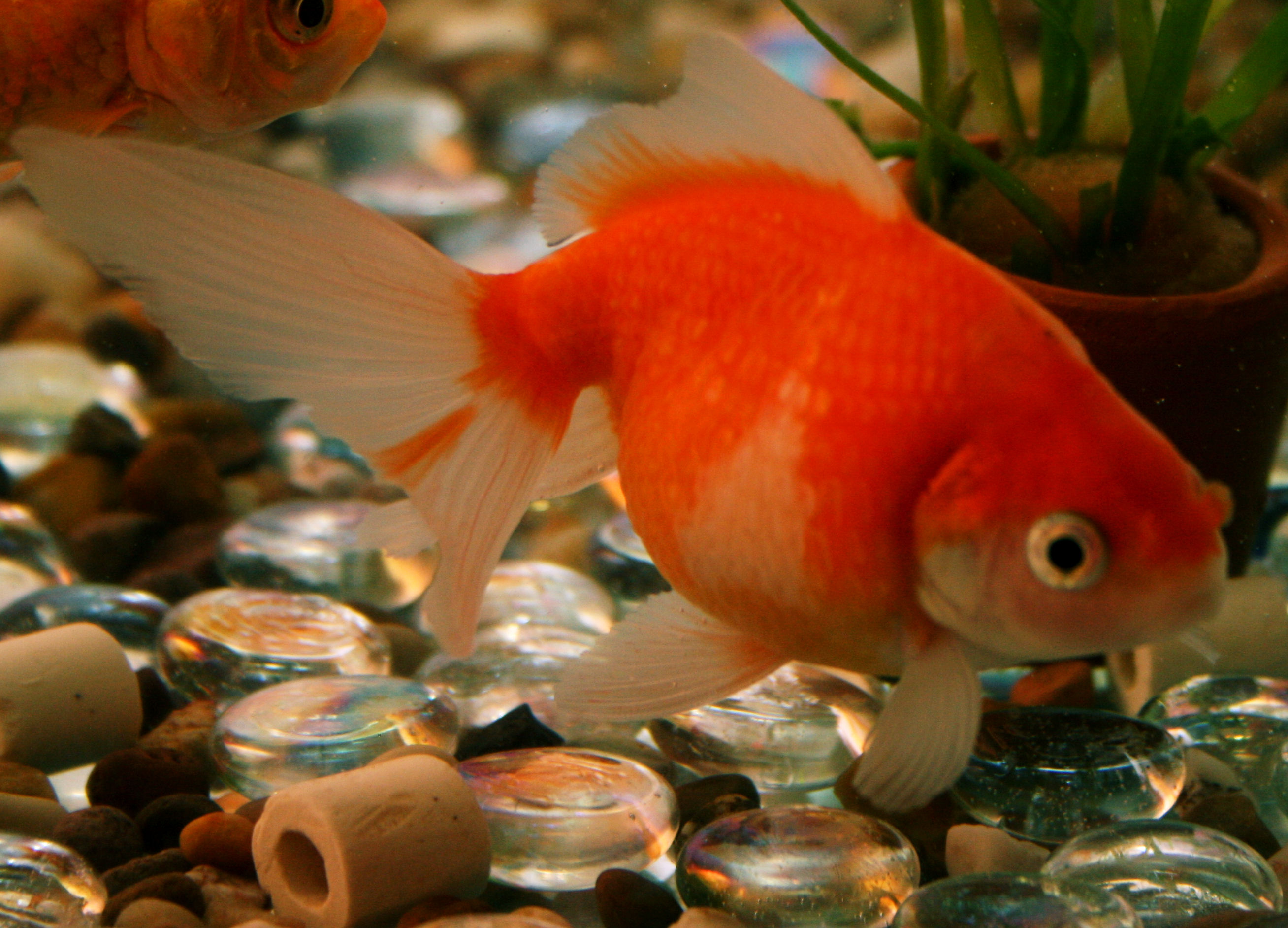
Pearlscale before wen and domed scales have developed

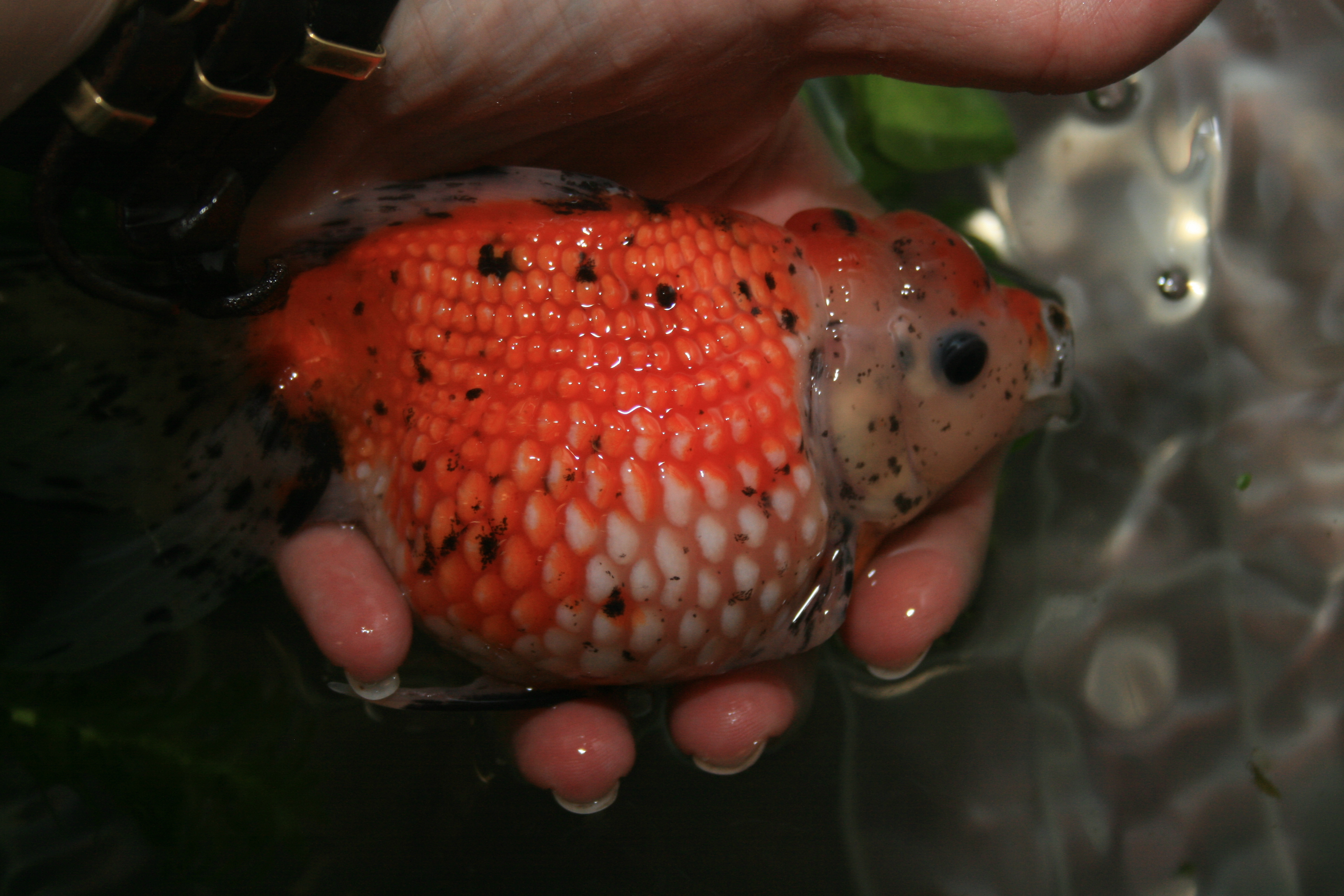
Pearlscale goldfish in a hand

== Coloration ==
Pearlscales come in many color varieties.

The color may be metallic (ideally self-colored or variegated in a pleasing pattern and similar on each side), orange or calico. The Pearlscale may also be fully black in color. Metallic colors should appear as burnished metal, extending into the fins. Calico fish should have a blue background with patches of violet, red, orange, yellow and brown, spotted with black.

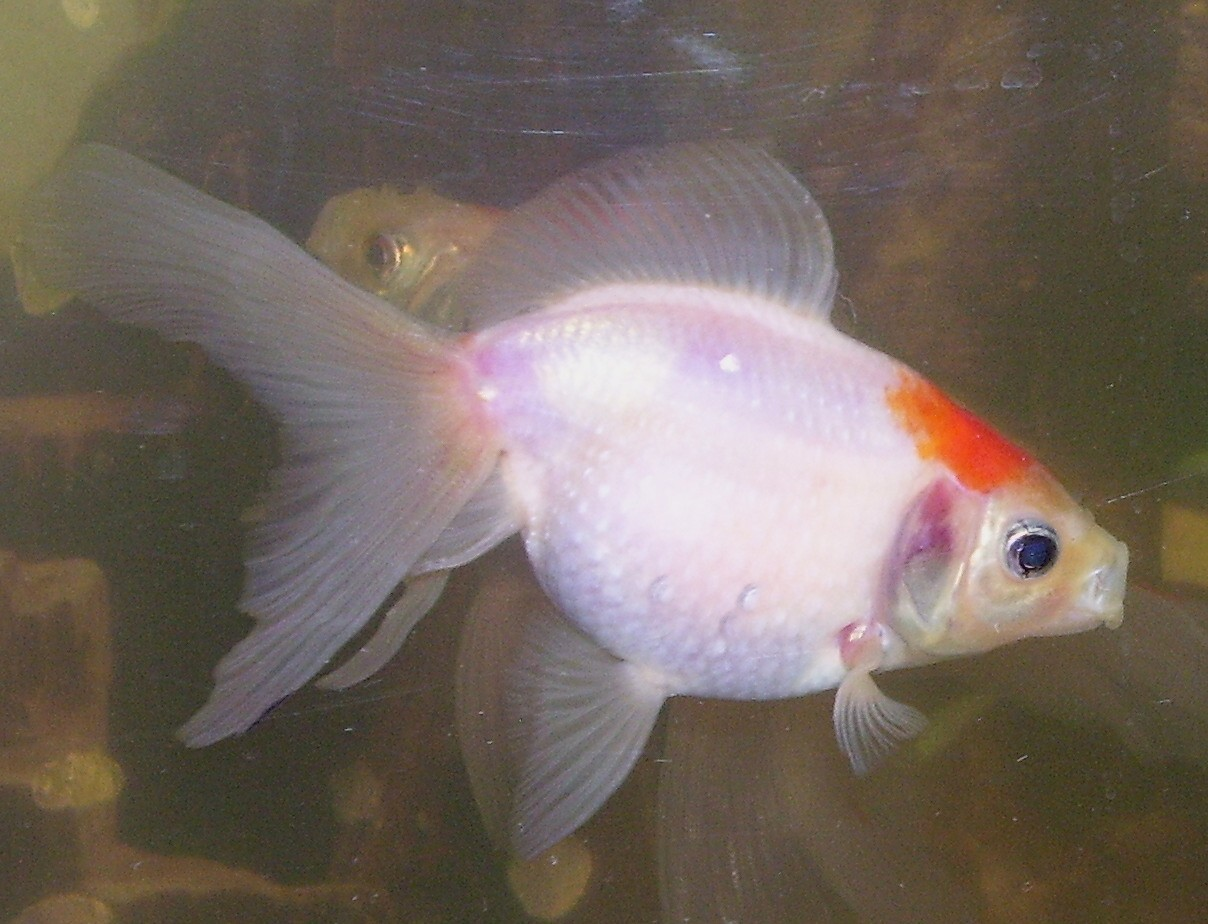
A young Pearlscale before wen development

== Variants ==
Pearlscales are found without headgrowth (wen), with Oranda-like headgrowth, or with two large bubble domes. The bubble-domed Pearlscales are known as High-head Pearlscale, Crown Pearlscale or Hama Nishiki.

== Special requirements ==
Like many fancy goldfish, Pearlscales are egg-shaped with internal organs crowded in a compacted body, therefore overfeeding should be avoided. Pearlscales are very sensitive to cold water and should not be exposed to temperatures below 55 °F (13 °C). They are also quite vulnerable to pH changes and should not be exposed for long periods to overly acidic or alkaline environments.

== Cruelty ==
The breeding and marketing of fancy goldfish with extreme mutations is sometimes seen as cruel practice by fish keepers and animal rights activists. Because the Pearlscale Goldfish has been bred to such a spherical shape, it may experience problems with its spine and internal organs, reducing its quality of life and longevity.

Single-tailed, common goldfish varieties such as comets are less highly bred and tend to experience less health problems and a greater lifespan than fancy varieties.

== See also ==
- Oranda
- Fantail
