= Tamasaba =

Fancy goldfish

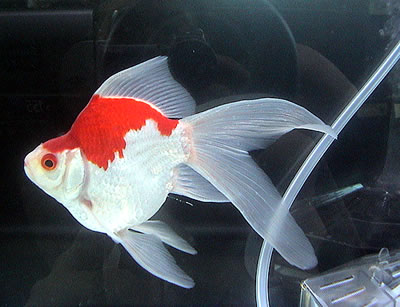
- Country of origin: Japan
- Type: Single tailed

Classification

The Tamasaba (玉サバ) or Sabao is an uncommon Japanese variety of goldfish with a body shape similar to a Ryukin or a Fantail, but with a long, flowing, single tail that is similar to that of a mackerel, hence its other name, Mackerel Tail. This attractive and strong goldfish variety makes a very suitable pond fish and aquarium fish. Usually white and red tamasaba is rarely seen with other colors. It withstands the cold very well.

The Tamasaba originated from the Yamagata Prefecture in northern Japan, hence it is also known as Yamagata Kingyō or Yamagata Goldfish.
