= Fantail (disambiguation) =

Fantail are birds of the genus Rhipidura and subfamily Rhipidurinae.

Fantail may also refer to:

- Fantail (goldfish), a breed of goldfish
- Fantail (pigeon), a breed of domestic pigeon
- Fantail (album), a 2002 album by Merzbow
- Fantail (film), a 2013 film from New Zealand
- Windmill fantail, a little windmill - the "fan" - mounted at right angles to the sails at the rear ("tail") of a windmill's cap to bring them automatically into the wind

== Aircraft and seacraft ==
- Fantail (ship), an overhanging stern design on some ships
- Fenestron (Fantail), a helicopter anti-torque system based on a ducted fan
- Lavochkin La-15 "Fantail", an early Soviet jet fighter
- Landing Vehicle Tracked "Fantail", codename during the Italian campaign in World War II

== See also ==
- Tail fan (disambiguation)
