= Tail fan =

Tail fan can refer to:

- Tail fan of a decapod, see decapod anatomy
- Tail fan of a bird, see Rump (croup)
- Windmill fantail, which turns the cap automatically to bring it into the wind

== See also ==
- Fantail (disambiguation)
