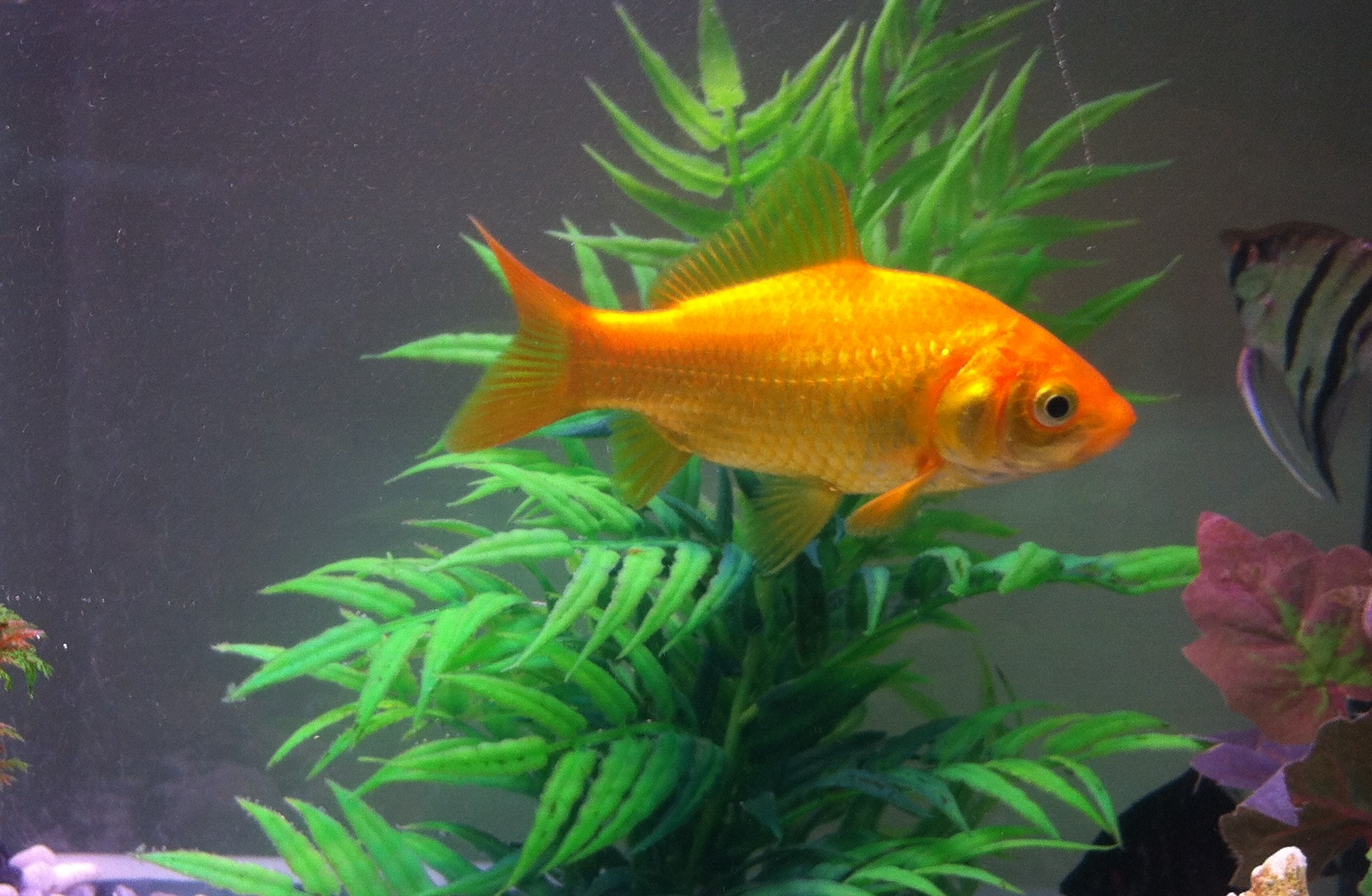

Conservation status
- Least Concern (IUCN 3.1)

Scientific classification
- Kingdom: Animalia
- Phylum: Chordata
- Class: Actinopterygii
- Division: Teleostei
- Order: Cypriniformes
- Family: Cyprinidae
- Subfamily: Cyprininae
- Genus: Carassius
- Species: C. auratus

Binomial name
- Carassius auratus (Linnaeus, 1758)

Synonyms
- List of synonyms: Carassius discolor (Basilewsky, 1855); Carassius burgeri (Temminck & Schlegel, 1846); Carassius coeruleus (Basilewsky, 1855); Carassius encobia (Bonaparte, 1845); Carassius grandoculis (Temminck & Schlegel, 1846); Carassius pekinensis (Basilewsky, 1855); Cyprinus auratus (Linnaeus, 1758); Cyprinus gibelioides (Cantor, 1842); Cyprinus mauritianus (Bennett, 1832); Cyprinus chinensis (Gronow, 1854); Cyprinus maillardi (Guichenot); Cyprinus nigrescens (Günther, 1868); Cyprinus thoracatus (Valenciennes 1842); Neocarassius ventricosus (Castelnau, 1872)

= Goldfish =

Freshwater fish common in aquariums

Goldfish
- Traditional Chinese: 金魚
- Simplified Chinese: 金鱼
- Literal meaning: "gold fish"
Transcriptions
Standard Mandarin
- Hanyu Pinyin: jīnyú

The goldfish (Carassius auratus) is a freshwater fish in the family Cyprinidae of the order Cypriniformes. It is commonly kept as a pet in indoor aquariums, and is one of the most popular aquarium fish. Goldfish released into the wild have become an invasive pest in parts of North America and Australia.

Native to China, the goldfish is a relatively small member of the genus Carassius (which also includes the Prussian carp and the crucian carp). It was first selectively bred for color in imperial China more than 1,000 years ago, where several distinct breeds were developed. Goldfish breeds vary greatly in size, body shape, fin configuration, and coloration. Various combinations of white, yellow, orange, red, brown, and black are known.

== History ==
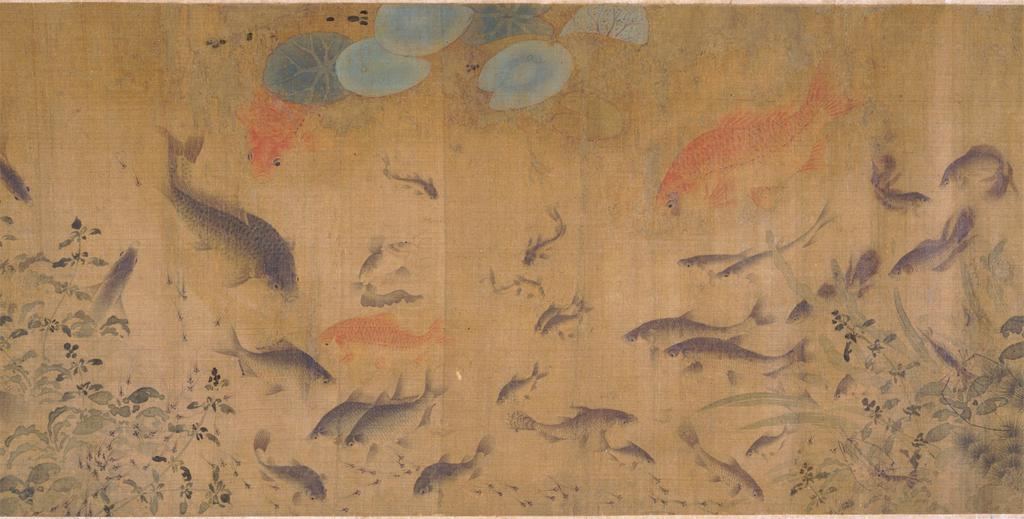
Goldfish from Fish Swimming Amid Falling Flowers, a Song dynasty painting by Liu Cai (c. 1080–1120)

Various species of carp (collectively known as Asian carp) have been bred and reared as food fish for thousands of years in East Asia. Some of these normally gray or silver species have a tendency to produce red, orange, or yellow color mutations; this was first recorded in Imperial China, during the Jin dynasty (266–420).

During the Tang dynasty (AD 618–907), it was popular to raise carp in ornamental ponds and water gardens. A natural genetic mutation produced gold (actually yellowish orange) rather than silver coloration. People began to selectively breed the gold variety instead of the silver variety, keeping them in ponds or other bodies of water. On special occasions at which guests were expected, they would be moved to a much smaller container for display.

By the Song dynasty (AD 960–1279), the selective domestic breeding of goldfish was firmly established. In 1162, the empress of the Song dynasty ordered the construction of a pond to collect the red and gold variety. By this time, people outside the imperial family were forbidden to keep goldfish of the gold (yellow) variety, yellow being the imperial color.

During the Ming dynasty (1368–1644), goldfish also began to be raised indoors, which permitted selection for mutations that would not be able to survive in ponds. The first occurrence of fancy-tailed goldfish was recorded in the Ming dynasty. In 1603, goldfish were introduced to Japan. In 1611, goldfish were introduced to Portugal and from there to other parts of Europe.

During the 1620s, goldfish were highly regarded in southern Europe because of their metallic scales, and symbolized good luck and fortune. It became a tradition for married men to give their wives a goldfish on their first anniversary, as a symbol for the prosperous years to come. This tradition quickly died, as goldfish became more available, losing their status. Goldfish were first introduced to North America around 1850 and quickly became popular in the United States. The largest breeder in the late 19th and early 20th century was Henry Bishop of Baltimore (1837-1907), known as the "Gold Fish King", his farms sold more than one million goldfish a year. It was believed to be the largest goldfish operation in the world.

== Biology ==
=== Taxonomy ===
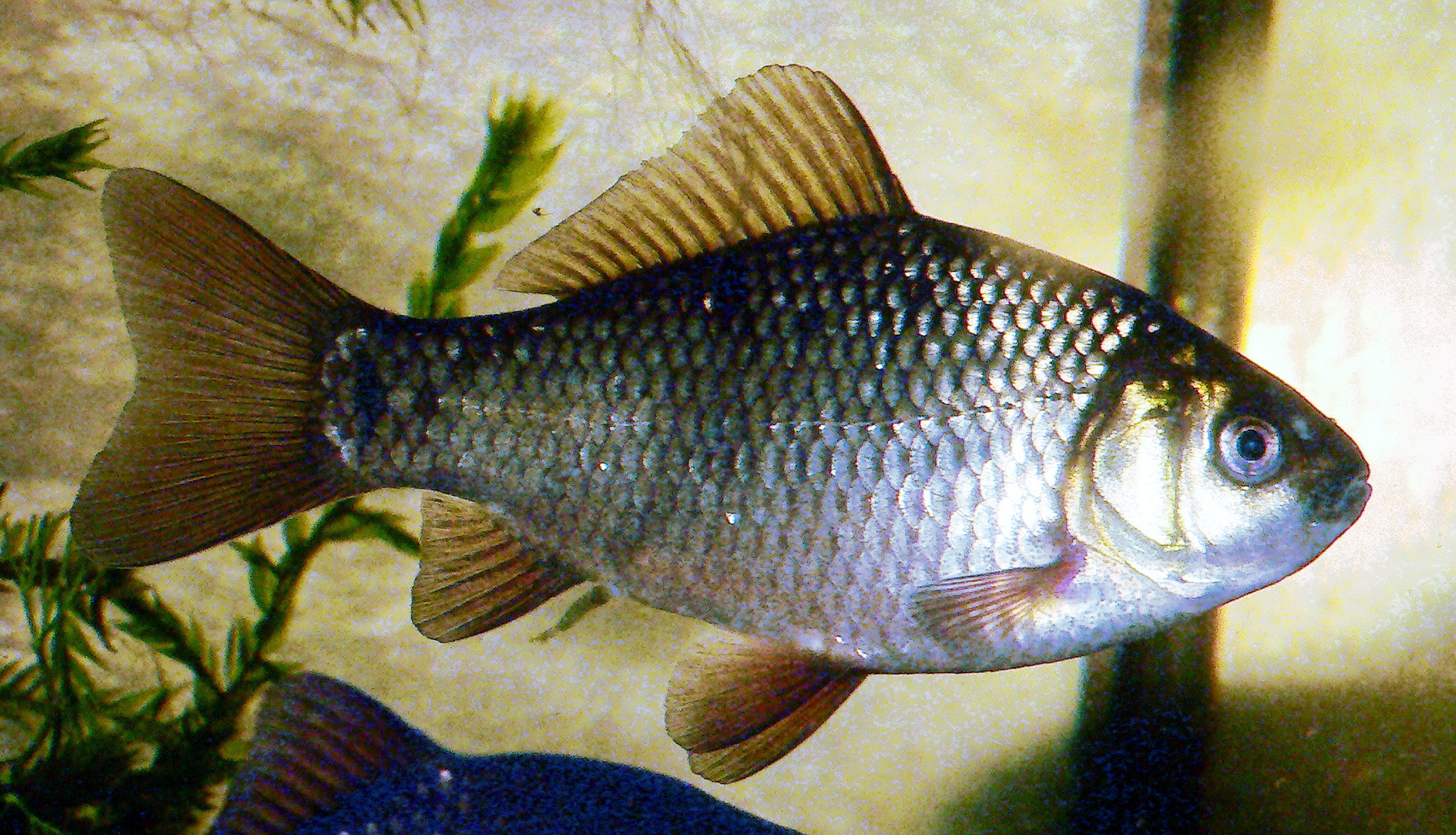
Crucian Carp (Carassius carassius), around 6 months old, 7 cm, from Haarlem, Netherlands.

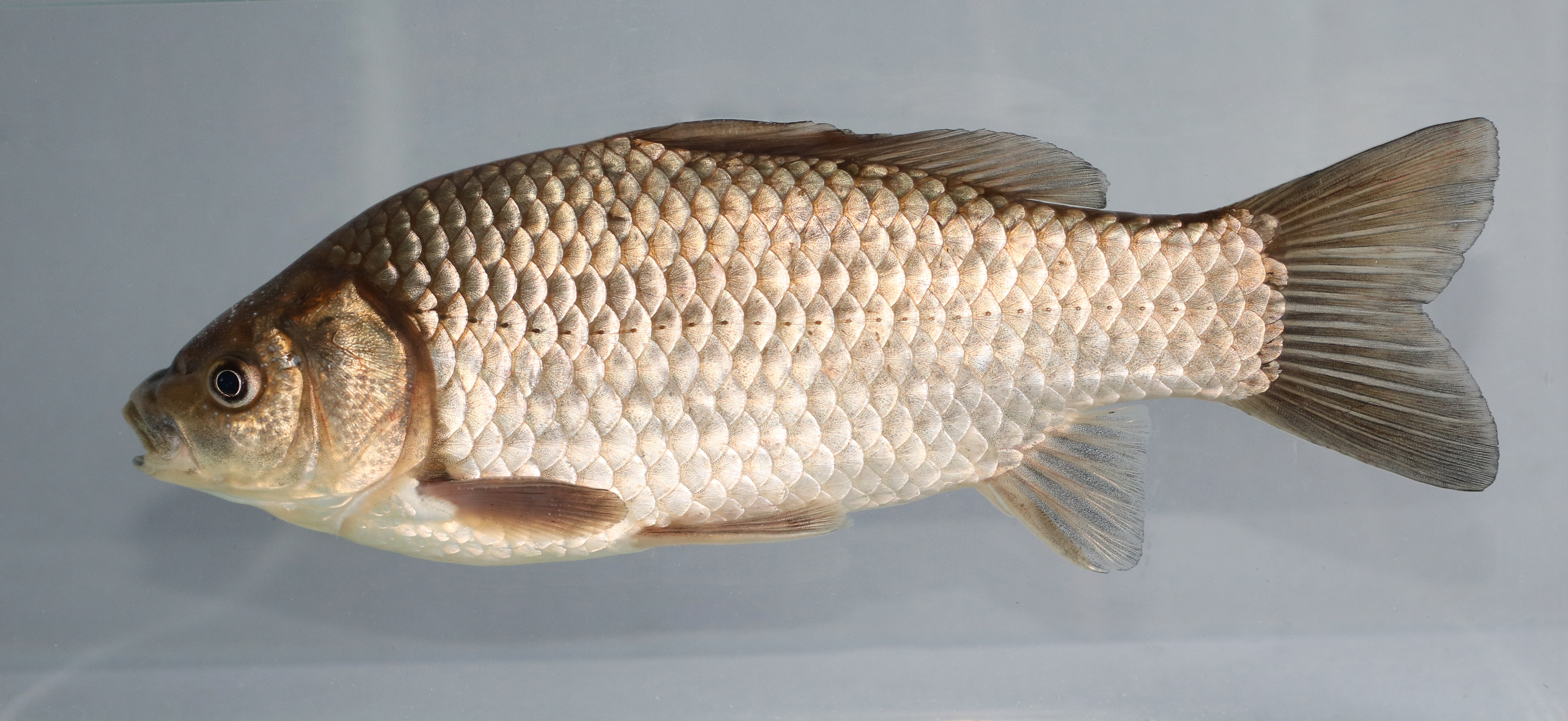
Male Prussian Carp (Carassius gibelio)

There has been considerable debate about the taxonomy of the goldfish. Previously, the goldfish was believed to be either a subspecies of the crucian carp (Carassius carassius), or of the Prussian carp (Carassius gibelio). However, modern genetic sequencing has suggested otherwise, and that modern goldfish are domesticated varieties of C. auratus that are native to Southern China. C. auratus are differentiated from other Carassius species by several characteristics. C. auratus have a more pointed snout, while the snout of C. carassius is well rounded. C. gibelio often has a grayish or greenish color, while crucian carp are always golden bronze. Juvenile crucian carp have a black spot on the base of the tail, which disappears with age. In C. auratus, this tail spot is never present. C. auratus have fewer than 31 scales along the lateral line, while crucian carp have 33 scales or more.

Goldfish can hybridize with some other Carassius species of carp. Koi and common carp may also interbreed with goldfish to produce sterile hybrids.

=== Size ===
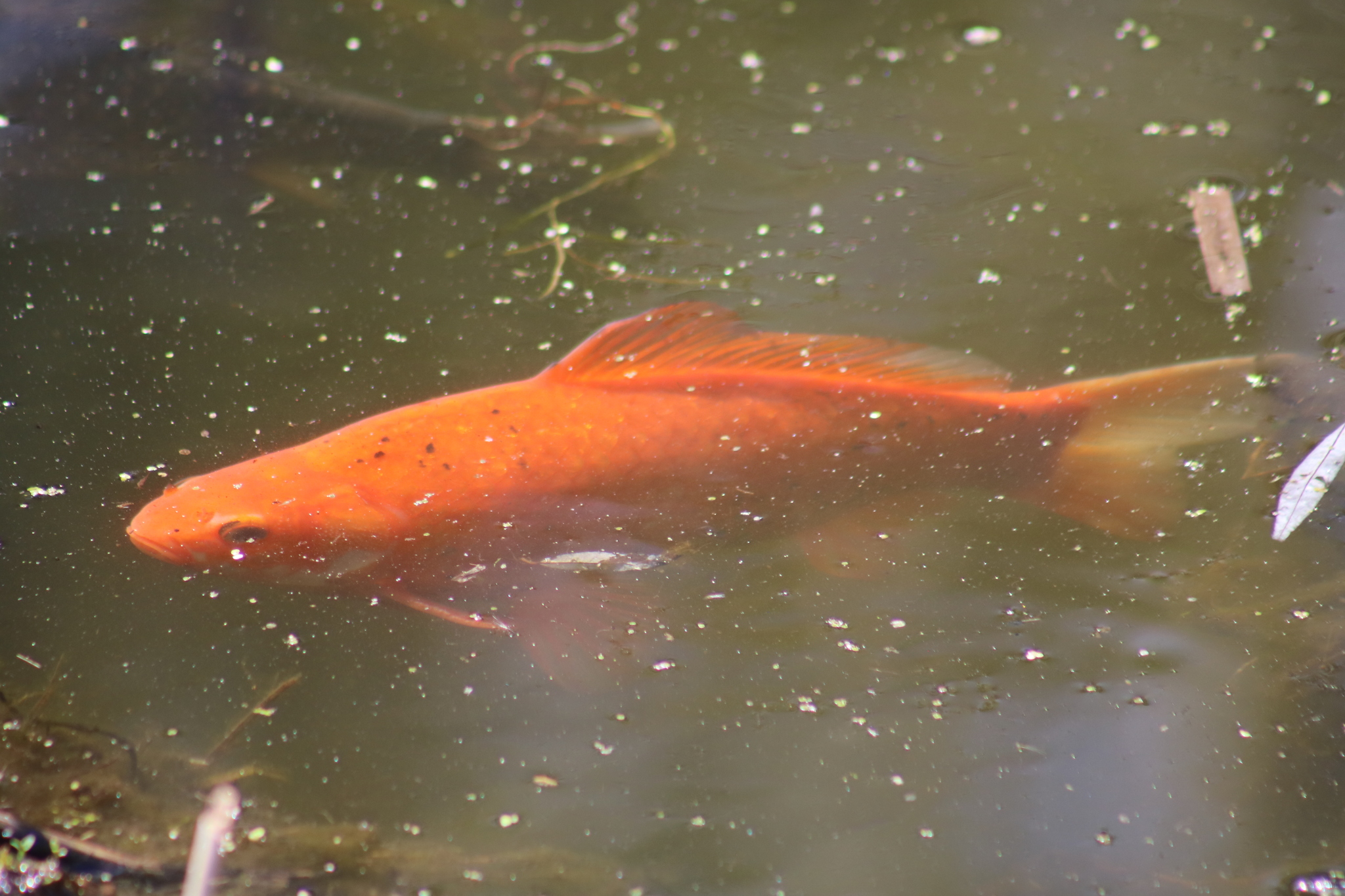
Feral goldfish found in Essex County, Ontario.

Wild goldfish typically grow to between 4.7 inches (12 cm) and 8.7 inches (22 cm) but can reach 16 inches (41 cm). The size of pet goldfish depends upon its breed and the container it lives in; while it is a myth that goldfish grow to fit the size of their tank, its growth rate is influenced by the size of the tank.

As of April 2008, the largest goldfish in the world was believed by the BBC to measure 19 inches (48 cm), in the Netherlands. At the time, a goldfish named "Goldie", kept as a pet in a tank in Folkestone, England, was measured as 15 inches (38 cm) and over 2 pounds (0.91 kg), and named as the second largest in the world behind the Netherlands fish. The secretary of the Federation of British Aquatic Societies (FBAS) stated of Goldie's size, "I would think there are probably a few bigger goldfish that people don't think of as record holders, perhaps in ornamental lakes". In July 2010, a goldfish measuring 16 inches (41 cm) and 5 pounds (2.3 kg) was caught in a pond in Poole, England, thought to have been abandoned there after outgrowing a tank. On November 16, 2020, a 15-inch (38 cm) goldfish weighing 9 pounds (4.1 kg) was found in a 16 acres (6.5 ha) lake in Greenville, South Carolina, while conducting a population survey of Oak Grove Lake.

Feral goldfish found in Gloucestershire

=== Vision ===
As a domestic fish, thus an easily accessible model organism, goldfish have one of the most studied senses of vision in fishes. Goldfish have four kinds of cone cells, which are respectively sensitive to different colors: red, green, blue and ultraviolet. The ability to distinguish between four different primary colors classifies them as tetrachromats.

=== Hearing ===
Goldfish have one of the most studied senses of hearing in fish. They have two otoliths, permitting the detection of sound particle motion, and Weberian ossicles connecting the swim bladder to the otoliths, facilitating the detection of sound pressure.

=== Reproduction ===
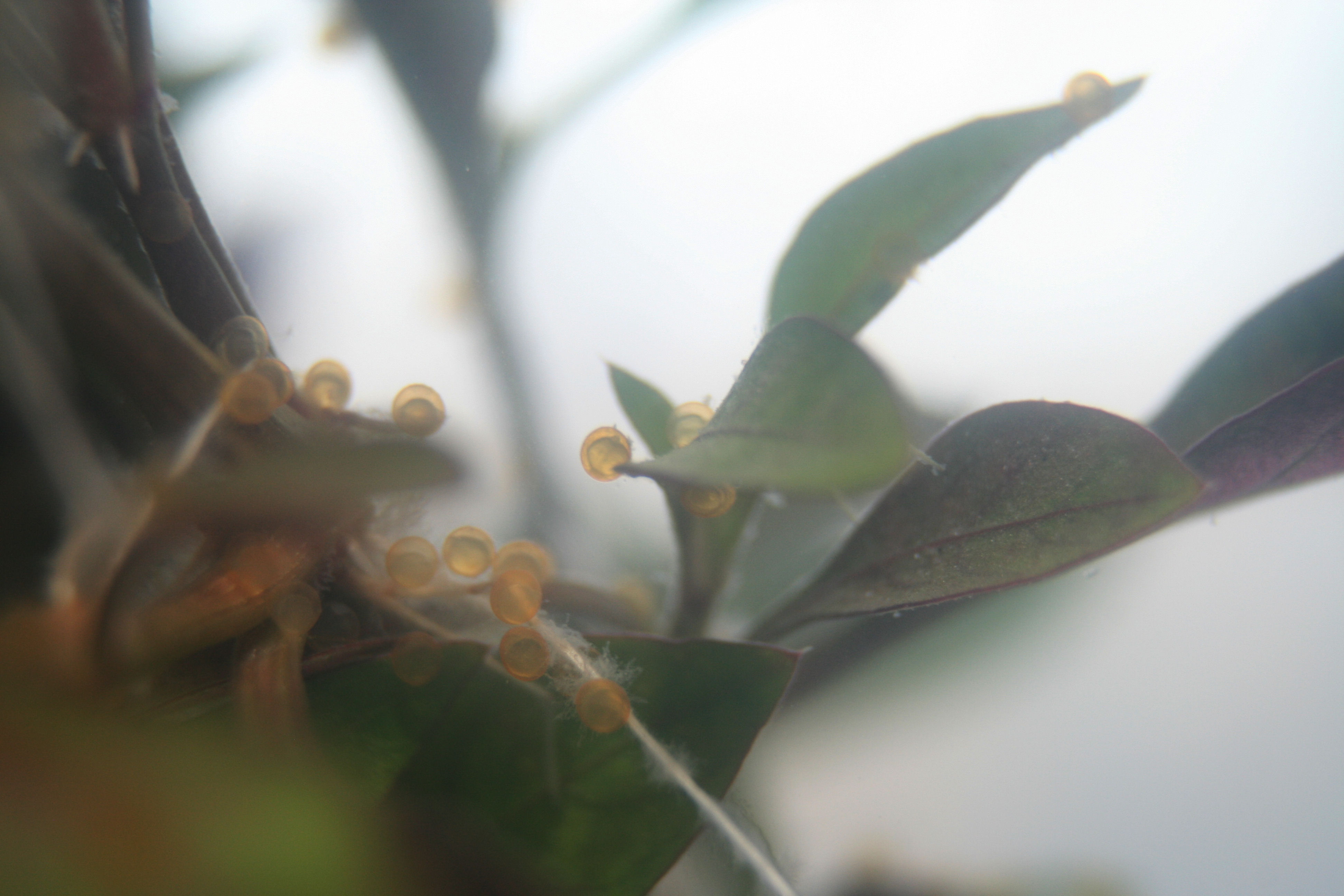
Goldfish eggs.

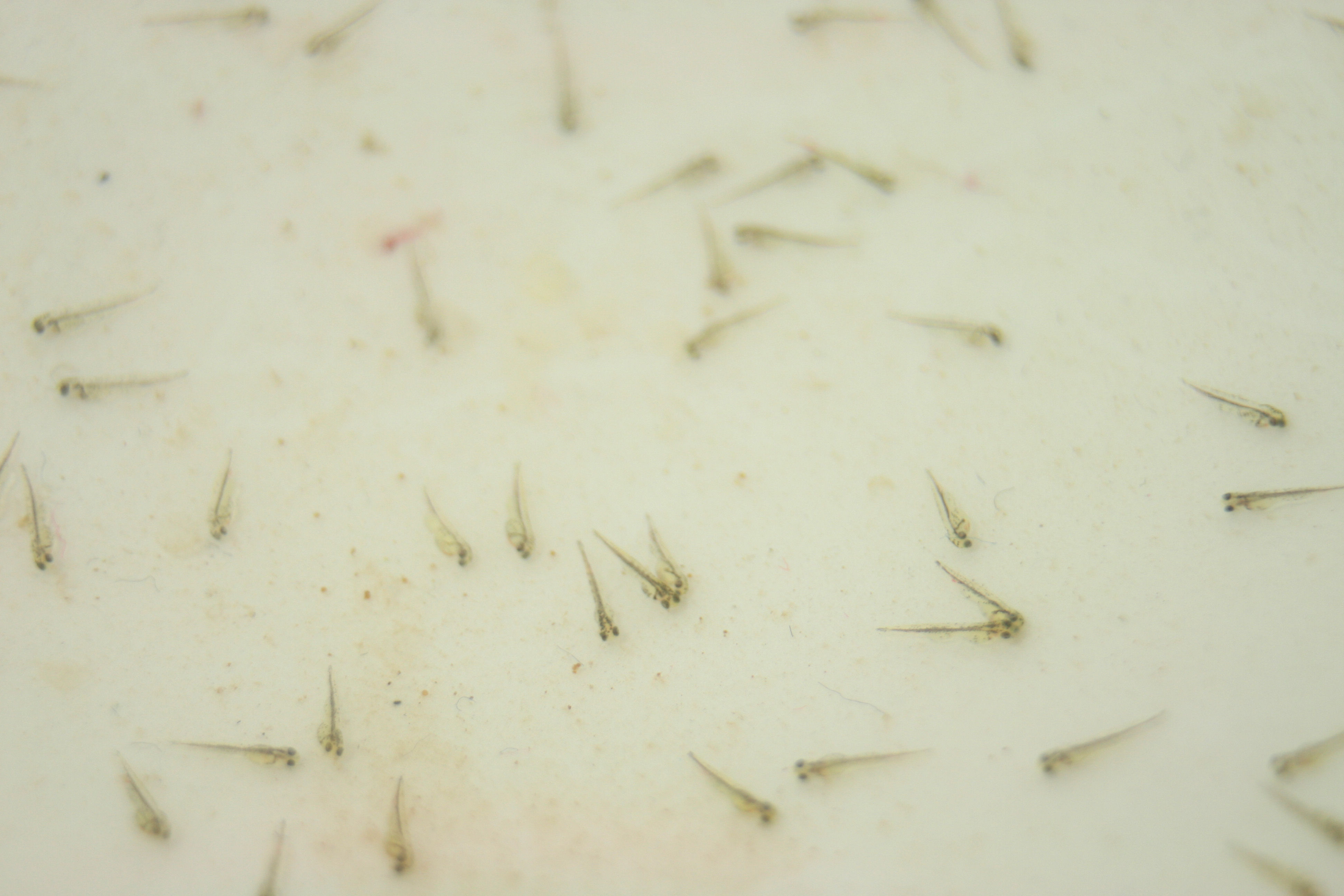
Newly hatched goldfish fry (Ryukin).

Goldfish can only grow to sexual maturity with enough water and the right nutrition. Most goldfish breed in captivity, particularly in pond settings. Breeding usually happens after a significant temperature change, often in spring. Males chase gravid female goldfish (females carrying eggs), and prompt them to release their eggs by bumping and nudging them.

Goldfish, like all cyprinids, are egg-layers. Their eggs are adhesive and attach to aquatic vegetation, typically dense plants such as Cabomba or Elodea or a spawning mop. The eggs hatch within 48 to 72 hours.

Within a week or so, the fry begins to assume its final shape, although a year may pass before they develop a mature goldfish color; until then they are a metallic brown like their wild ancestors. In their first weeks of life, the fry grow quickly—an adaptation born of the high risk of being devoured by adult goldfish (or other fish and insects) in their environment.

Some highly selectively bred goldfish can no longer breed naturally due to their altered shape. The artificial breeding method called "hand stripping" can assist in breeding, but can harm the fish if not done correctly. In captivity, adults may also eat young that they encounter.

=== Respiration ===
Goldfish are able to survive short periods of entirely anoxic conditions. Survival is shorter under higher temperatures, suggesting that this is a cold weather adaptation. Researchers speculate that this is specifically an adaptation to survival in frozen water bodies over winter. Energy is obtained from liver glycogen. This process depends upon a pyruvate decarboxylase – the first known in vertebrates.

=== Salinity ===
Although they are a freshwater fish, goldfish have been found in brackish water with a salinity of 17.

== Behavior ==
Goldfish are gregarious, displaying schooling behavior, as well as displaying the same types of feeding behaviors.

Goldfish have learned behaviors, both as groups and as individuals, that stem from native carp behavior. They are a generalist species with varied feeding, breeding, and predator avoidance behaviors that contribute to their success. As fish, they can be described as "friendly" towards each other. Very rarely does a goldfish harm another goldfish, nor do the males harm the females during breeding. The only real threat that goldfish present to each other is competing for food. Commons, comets, and other faster varieties can easily eat all the food during a feeding before slower varieties can reach it. This can lead to stunted growth or possible starvation of fancier varieties when they are kept in a pond with their single-tailed brethren. As a result, care should be taken to combine only breeds with similar body type and swim characteristics.

=== Cognitive abilities ===
Goldfish have strong associative learning abilities, as well as social learning skills. In addition, their visual acuity allows them to distinguish between individual humans. Owners may notice that fish react favorably to them (swimming to the front of the glass, swimming rapidly around the tank, and going to the surface mouthing for food) while hiding when other people approach the tank. Over time, goldfish learn to associate their owners and other humans with food, often "begging" for food whenever their owners approach.

Goldfish that have constant visual contact with humans also stop considering them to be a threat. After being kept in a tank for several weeks, sometimes months, it becomes possible to feed a goldfish by hand without it shying away.

Goldfish have a memory span of at least three months and can distinguish between different shapes, colors, and sounds. By using positive reinforcement, goldfish can be trained to recognize and to react to light signals of different colors or to perform tricks. Fish respond to certain colors most evidently in relation to feeding. Fish learn to anticipate feedings provided they occur at around the same time every day.

== Classification ==
=== Western ===
As with many other examples of animal, selective breeding of goldfish over centuries has produced several color variations, some of them far removed from the "golden" color of the original fish. There are also different body shapes, and fin and eye configurations. Some extreme versions of the goldfish live only in aquariums—they are much less hardy than varieties closer to the "wild" original. However, some variations are hardier, such as the Shubunkin. Currently, there are about 300 breeds recognized in China. The vast majority of goldfish breeds today originated from China. Some of the main varieties are:

Common goldfish	Black Telescope	Bubble Eye
Common Goldfish come in a variety of colors including red, orange, "gold", white, black, and yellow ('lemon') goldfish.	The Black Telescope is a black-colored variant of telescope goldfish that has a characteristic pair of protruding eyes. It is also referred to as popeye, moor, kuro-demekin in Japan and dragon-eye in China.	The small Bubble Eye has no dorsal fin and upward pointing eyes accompanied by two large fluid-filled sacs.
Celestial Eye	Comet	Fantail
The Celestial eye goldfish or Choten gan has a double tail and a breed-defining pair of upturned, telescope eyes with pupils gazing skyward.	The comet or comet-tailed goldfish is a single-tailed variety in the United States. It is similar to the common goldfish, except slightly smaller and slimmer, and is mainly distinguished by its long, deeply forked tail.	The Fantail goldfish is the western form of the Ryukin and possesses an egg-shaped body, a high dorsal fin, a long quadruple caudal fin, and no shoulder hump.
Lionhead	Oranda	Pearlscale
The lionhead has a hood. This fish is the precursor to the ranchu.	The oranda is characterised by a prominent raspberry-like hood (also known as wen or head growth) that encases the whole head and some with the entire face, except for the eyes and mouth.	The pearlscale or chinshurin in Japanese, is spherical-bodied with finnage similar to the fantail and veiltail. Its scales are protruded into white domes that resemble pearls.
Pompom	Ryukin	Shubunkin
The Pompoms, pompons or hanafusa have bundles of loose fleshy outgrowths between the nostril, called nasal boquettes, on each side of the head.	The ryukin has a short, deep body with a characteristic shoulder hump.	The Japanese shubunkin (朱文金) (translated literally as "red brocade") have a single tail with nacreous scales, and a pattern known as calico.
Telescope	Ranchu	Panda Telescope
The telescope is characterized by its protruding eyes. It is also known as the globe eye or dragon eye goldfish.	The Japanese ranchu is hooded. The Japanese refer to it as the "king of goldfish".	The panda telescope is another colored variant of telescope goldfish.
Veiltail	Butterfly tail	Meteor goldfish
The veiltail is known for its extra-long, flowing double tail. Modern veiltail standards require little or no indentation of the trailing edges of the caudal fins, as in a wedding veil for a bride.	The butterfly tail moor or butterfly telescope is of the telescope-eye lineage, with twin broad tails best viewed from above. The spread of the caudal fins resembles butterflies underwater.	The meteor goldfish is a strange-looking variety that has been developed by specialist breeders of goldfish. It has no tail fin, hence its name.
Lionchu	Egg-fish goldfish	Shukin
The Lionchu or lionhead-ranchu is a goldfish that has resulted from crossbreeding lionheads and ranchus.	The egg-fish goldfish is a goldfish that lacks a dorsal fin and has a pronounced egg-shaped body.	The Shukin is a Ranchu-like goldfish developed from Ranchus and Orandas at the end of the 19th century in Japan.
Curled-gill goldfish	Tamasaba	Tosakin
The Curled-gill or Reversed-gill goldfish is another uncommon variety of goldfish that has been developed by specialist enthusiasts. It owes its name to the out-turned appearance of its gill covers.	The Tamasaba or Sabao is an uncommon Japanese variety of goldfish with a body shaped similar to the Ryukin and a very long, flowing, single tail that is similar to that of a comet goldfish, hence its other name, comet-tail ryukin.	The Tosakin is a very distinctive breed of goldfish with a large tail fin that spreads out horizontally (like a fan) behind the fish, followed by the bottom tips folding behind its caudal fin. Though technically a divided tail, the two halves are attached at the center, forming a single fin.
White Telescope	Jikin	Orange Telescope
The White telescope is a white variant of the telescope goldfish that has a white body and a characteristic pair of protruding eyes.	The Jikin is a breed of wakin-like goldfish developed in Japan.	The Orange Telescope goldfish is yet another coloration variant of the telescope goldfish, having an orange or "gold"-colored body and the eye protrusions characteristic of the telescope goldfish.

=== Chinese ===
Chinese tradition classifies goldfish into four main types. These classifications are not commonly used in the West.

- Crucian (also called "grass") — Goldfish without anatomical features, similar to Crucian carp or grass carp except for their coloration. These include the common goldfish, comet goldfish and Shubunkin.
- Wen — Goldfish having a tail, e.g., fantails and veiltails. "Wen" is also the name of the characteristic headgrowth on such strains as oranda and lionhead.
- Dragon Eye — Goldfish having extended eyes, e.g., black moor, bubble eye, and telescope eye
- Egg — Goldfish having no dorsal fin, usually with an 'egg-shaped' body, e.g., lionhead. This group includes a bubble eye without a dorsal fin.

== Cultivation ==
=== In aquariums ===
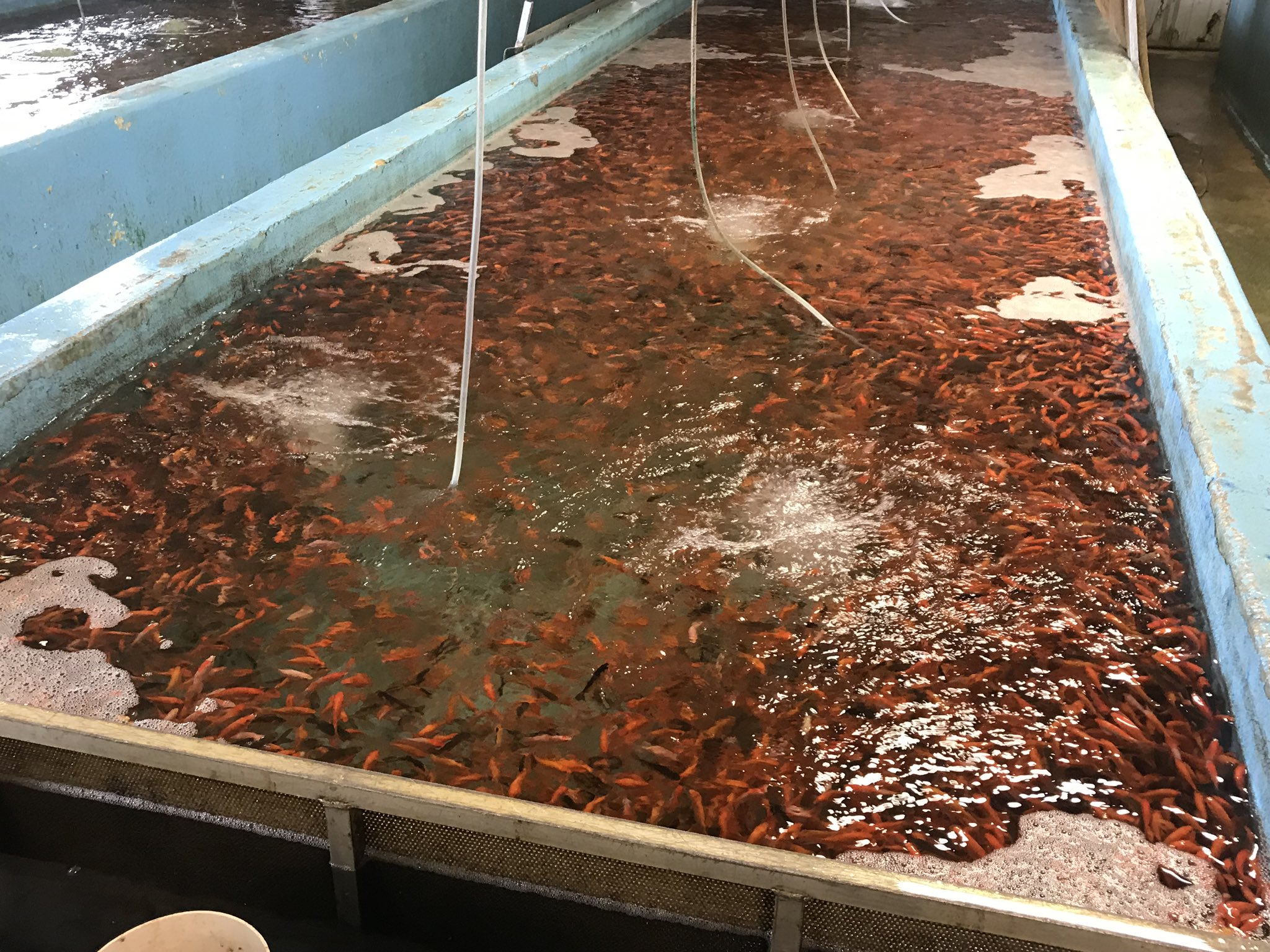
Pool Fisheries, a goldfish farm in Lonoke, Arkansas

Like most species in the carp family, goldfish produce a large amount of waste both in their feces and through their gills, releasing harmful chemicals into the water. Buildup of this waste to toxic levels can occur in a relatively short period of time, and can easily cause a goldfish's death. For common and comet varieties, each goldfish should have about 20 US gallons (76 L; 17 imp gal) of water. Smaller fantail goldfish should have about 10 US gallons (38 L; 8.3 imp gal) per goldfish. The water surface area determines how much oxygen diffuses and dissolves into the water. A general rule is have 1 square foot (0.093 m^{2}). Active aeration by way of a water pump, filter or fountain effectively increases the surface area agitation.

The goldfish is classified as a coldwater fish, and can live in unheated aquaria at a temperature comfortable for humans. However, rapid changes in temperature, for example in an office building in winter when the heat is turned off at night, can kill them, especially if the tank is small. Care must also be taken when adding water, as the new water may be of a different temperature. Temperatures under about 10 °C (50 °F) are dangerous to fancy varieties, though commons and comets can survive slightly lower temperatures. Extremely high temperatures (over 30 °C (86 °F)) can also harm goldfish. However, higher temperatures may help fight protozoan infestations by accelerating the parasite's life cycle—thus eliminating it more quickly. The optimum temperature for goldfish is between 20 and 22 °C (68 and 72 °F).

Like all fish, goldfish do not like to be petted. In fact, touching a goldfish can endanger its health, because it can cause the protective slime coat to be damaged or removed, exposing the fish's skin to infection from bacteria or water-borne parasites. However, goldfish respond to people by surfacing at feeding time, and can be trained or acclimated to taking pellets or flakes from human fingers. The reputation of goldfish dying quickly is often due to poor care. The lifespan of goldfish in captivity can extend beyond 10 years.

If left in the dark for a period of time, goldfish gradually change color until they are almost gray. Goldfish produce pigment in response to light, similarly to how human skin becomes tanned in the sun. Fish have cells called chromatophores that produce pigments that reflect light and give the fish coloration. The color of a goldfish is determined by their diet, water quality, and exposure to light, along with age and health.

Because goldfish eat live plants, their presence in a planted aquarium can be problematic. Only a few aquarium plant species, such as Cryptocoryne and Anubias, can survive around goldfish, but they require special attention so that they are not uprooted.

=== In ponds ===
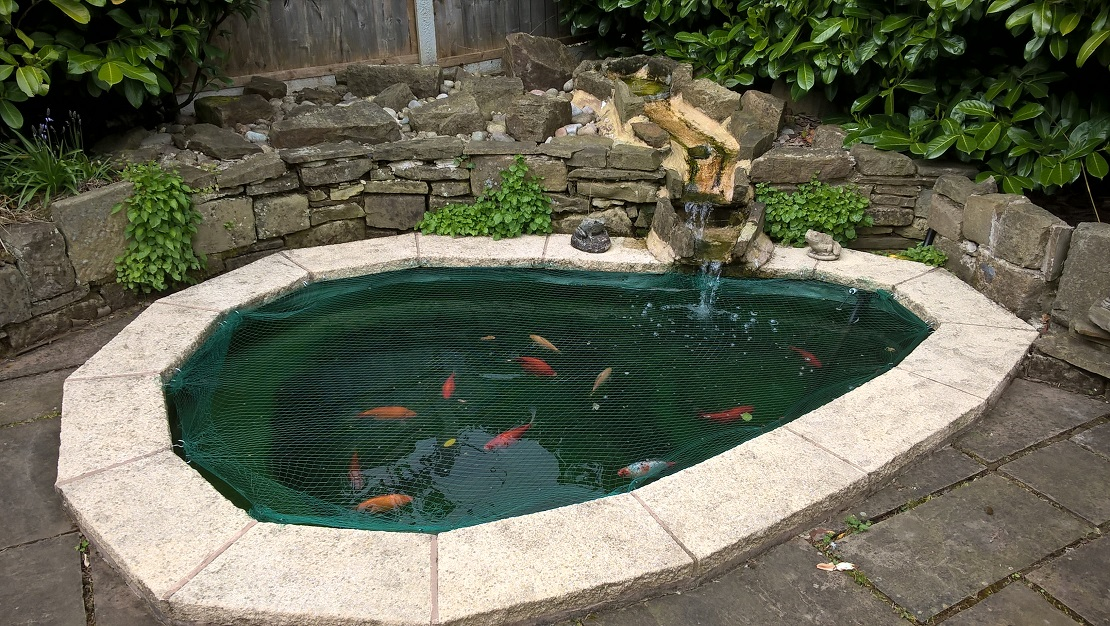
Coldwater goldfish pond in Bury, England

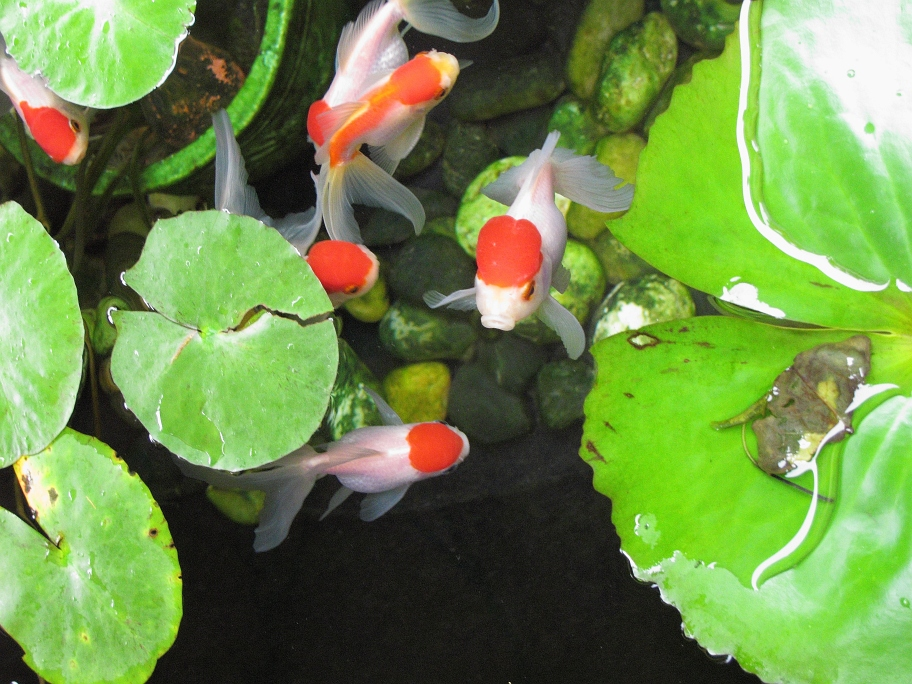
Red Oranda (Wen) goldfish reared in a small outdoor pond with lilies

Goldfish are popular pond fish, since they are small, inexpensive, colorful, and very hardy. In an outdoor pond or water garden, they may even survive for brief periods if ice forms on the surface, as long as there is enough oxygen remaining in the water and the pond does not freeze solid. Common, London and Bristol shubunkins, jikin, wakin, comet and some hardier fantail goldfish can be kept in a pond year-round in temperate and subtropical climates. Moor, veiltail, oranda and lionhead can be kept safely in outdoor ponds year-round only in more tropical climates and elsewhere only in summer months.

Compatible fish include rudd, tench, orfe and koi, but the last require specialized care. Ramshorn snails are helpful by eating any algae that grows in the pond. Without some form of animal population control, goldfish ponds can easily become overstocked. Fish such as orfe consume goldfish eggs.

Ponds small and large are fine in warmer areas, though goldfish can "overheat" in small volumes of water in the summer in tropical climates. In frosty climes, the depth should be at least 80 centimeters (31 in) to preclude freezing. During winter, goldfish become sluggish, stop eating and often stay on the bottom of the pond. This is normal; they become active again in the spring. Unless the pond is large enough to maintain its own ecosystem without interference from humans, a filter is important to clear waste and keep the pond clean. Plants are essential as they act as part of the filtration system, as well as a food source for the fish. Plants are further beneficial since they raise oxygen levels in the water.

Like their wild ancestors, common and comet goldfish as well as shubunkin can survive, and even thrive, in any climate that can support a pond. In general, when released into the wild, goldfish quickly take over the waterways as an invasive species.

=== Feeding ===
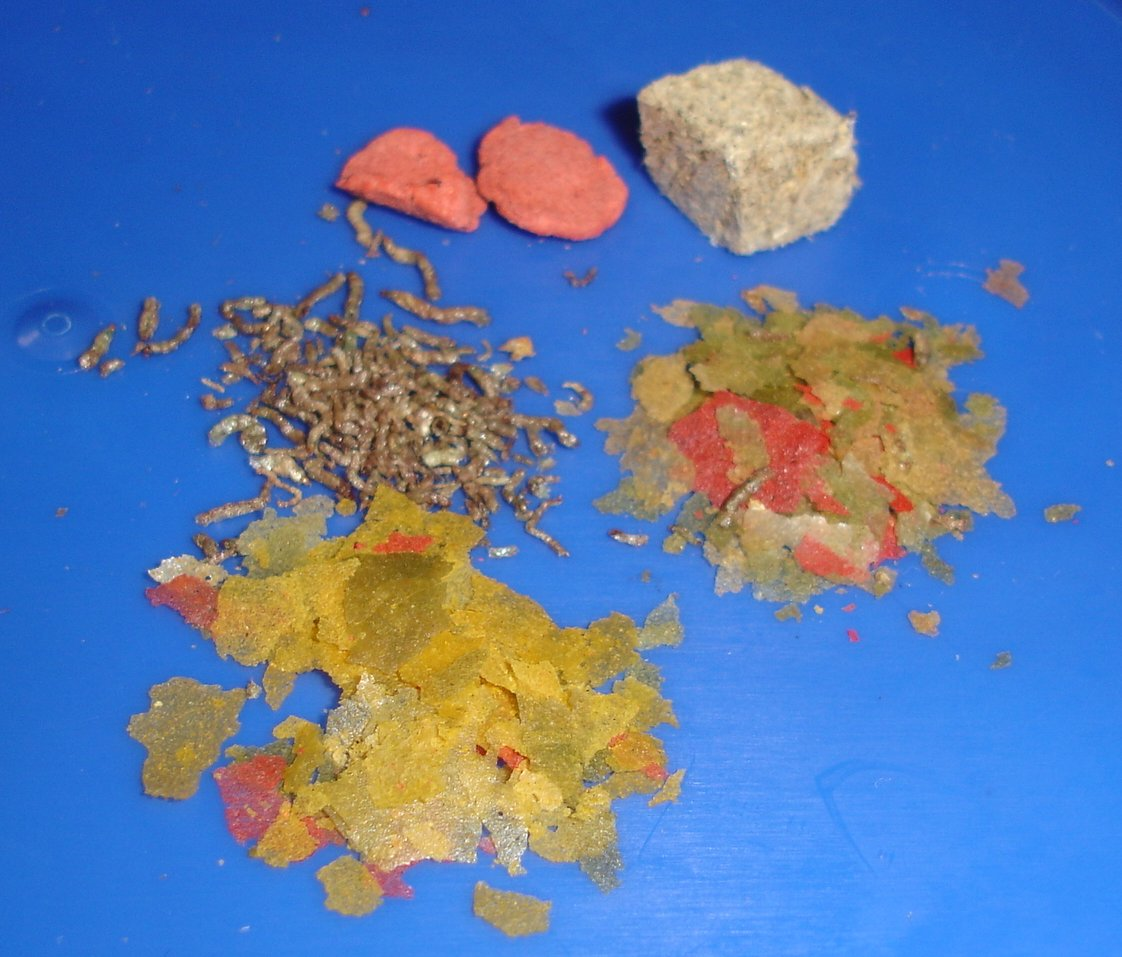
Various types of prepared fish food

In the wild, the diet of goldfish consists of crustaceans, insects, and various plant matter. Like most fish, they are opportunistic feeders and do not stop eating on their own accord. Overfeeding can be deleterious to their health, typically by blocking the intestines. This happens most often with selectively bred goldfish, which have a convoluted intestinal tract. When excess food is available, they produce more waste and feces, partly due to incomplete protein digestion. Overfeeding can sometimes be diagnosed by observing feces trailing from the fish's cloaca.

Goldfish-specific food has less protein and more carbohydrate than conventional fish food. Enthusiasts may supplement this diet with shelled peas (with outer skins removed), blanched green leafy vegetables, and bloodworms. Young goldfish benefit from the addition of brine shrimp to their diet. As with all animals, goldfish preferences vary.

=== For mosquito control ===
Like some other well-known aquarium fish, such as the guppy and mosquitofish, goldfish (and other carp) are frequently added to stagnant bodies of water in an attempt to reduce mosquito populations, which spread the vectors of diseases such as West Nile virus, malaria, and dengue. However, introducing goldfish has often had negative consequences for local ecosystems, and their efficacy as pest control has never been compared to those of native fishes.

=== Market ===
The market for live goldfish and other crucian carp usually imported from China was $1.2 million in 2018. Some high quality varieties cost between $125 and $300.

== Welfare concerns ==
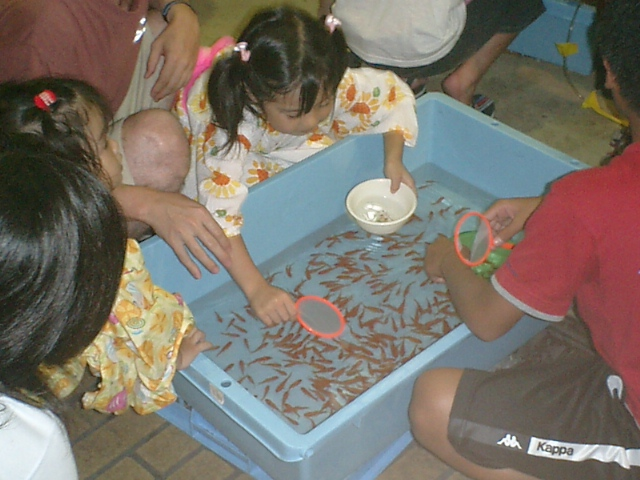
The Japanese game of goldfish scooping

Fishbowls are detrimental to the health of goldfish and are prohibited by animal welfare legislation in several municipalities. The practice of using bowls as permanent fish housing originated from a misunderstanding of Chinese "display" vessels: goldfish which were normally housed in ponds were, on occasion, temporarily displayed in smaller containers to be better admired by guests.

Goldfish kept in bowls or "mini-aquariums" suffer from death, disease, and stunting, due primarily to the low oxygen and very high ammonia/nitrite levels inherent in such an environment. In comparison to other common aquarium fish, goldfish have high oxygen needs and produce a large amount of waste due to the fact they lack a stomach; therefore they require a substantial volume of well-filtered water to thrive. In addition, all goldfish varieties have the potential to reach 5 inches (130 mm) in total length, with single-tailed breeds often exceeding 1 foot (0.30 m). Single-tailed varieties include common and comet goldfish.

In many countries, carnival and fair operators commonly give goldfish away in plastic bags as prizes. In late 2005 Rome banned the use of goldfish and other animals as carnival prizes. Rome has also banned the use of "goldfish bowls", on animal cruelty grounds, as well as Monza, Italy, in 2004. In the United Kingdom, the government proposed banning this practice as part of its Animal Welfare Bill, though this has since been amended to only prevent goldfish being given as prizes to unaccompanied minors.

In Japan, during summer festivals and religious holidays (ennichi), a traditional game called goldfish scooping is played, in which a player scoops goldfish from a basin with a special scooper. Sometimes bouncy balls are substituted for goldfish.

Although edible and closely related to some fairly widely eaten species, goldfish are rarely eaten. A fad among American college students for many years was swallowing goldfish as a stunt and as a fraternity initiation process. The first recorded instance was in 1939 at Harvard University. The practice gradually fell out of popularity over the course of several decades and is rarely practiced today.

Some animal advocates have called for boycotts of goldfish purchases, citing industrial farming and low survival rates of the fish.

== In popular culture ==
In Chinese history, goldfish was seen "as a symbol of luck and fortune". Moreover, only members of the Song dynasty could own goldfish. In Iran and among the international Iranian diaspora, goldfish is a traditional part of Nowruz celebrations. Goldfish are usually placed on Haft-sin tables as a symbol of progress.

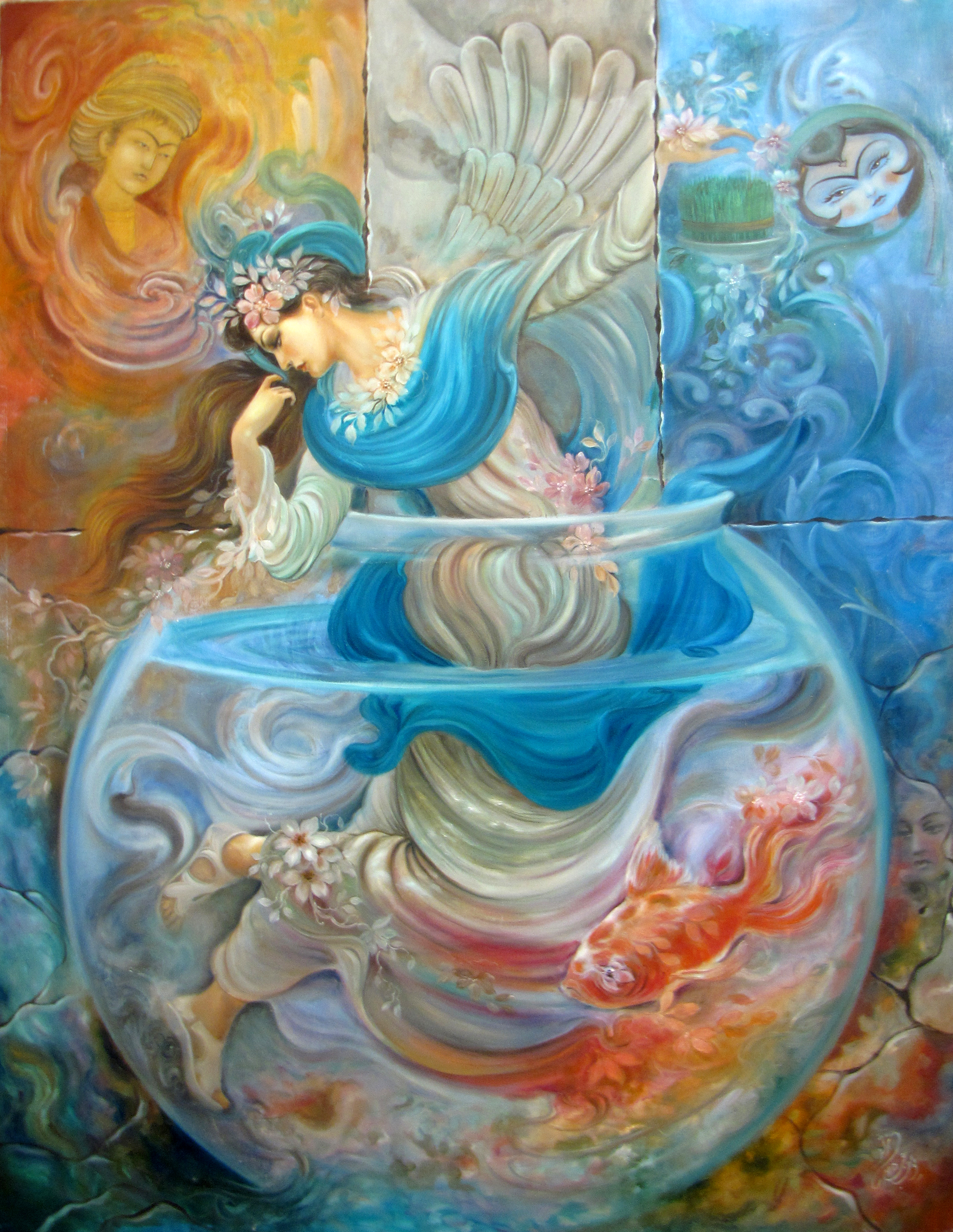
Goldfish is one of the items used among the Haft-sin symbols of Nowruz

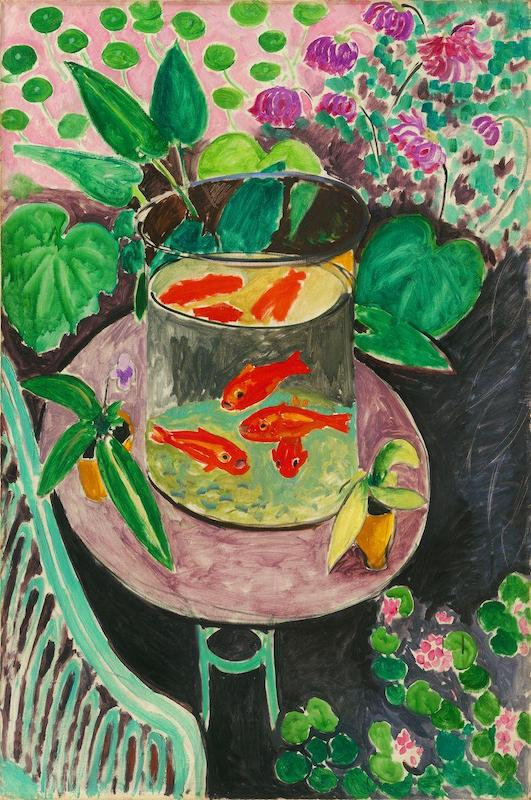
Goldfish by Henri Matisse, 1912

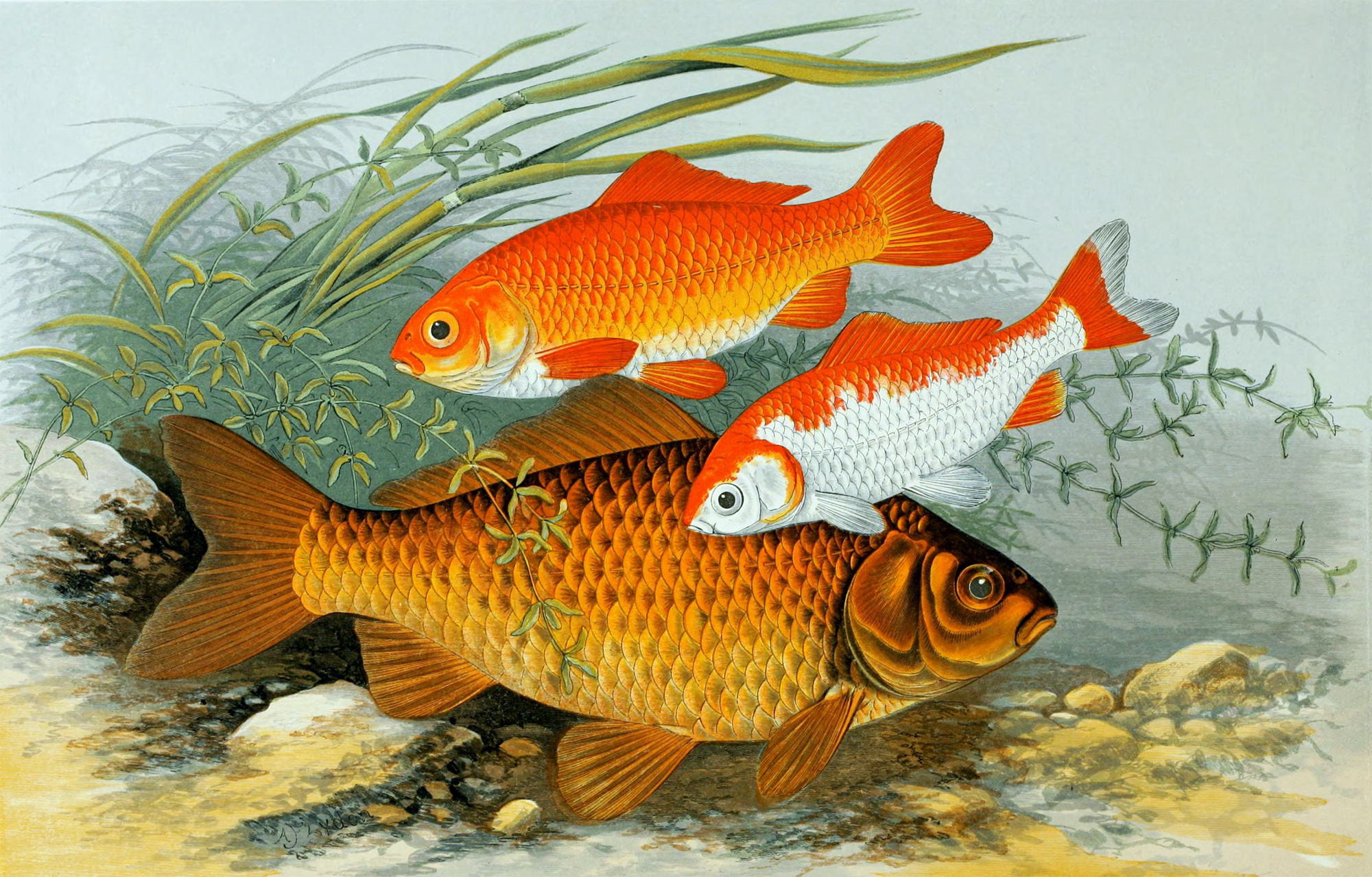
Carassius auratus by Alexander Francis Lydon, 1879

Illustration of various types of goldfish by Friedrich Justin Bertuch, 1807

== See also ==
- Aquaculture
- List of goldfish varieties
- Henri Matisse and goldfish
