= Wakin =

Variety of goldfish

- Country of origin: Japan
- Type: Streamlined/Intermediate

Classification
- BAS

The Wakin (和金; lit. 'Japanese Golden') is an intermediate twin tailed goldfish variety that originated from Japan. It is believed the wakin gave rise to fancy twin-tailed goldfish, including the ryūkin, ranchū, oranda, fantail pearlscale, and many more twin-tailed goldfish. It is also the second oldest variety, developed from the common goldfish.

== In Japan ==
The wakin has many popular cultures and beliefs in the history of Japanese goldfish. The wakin goldfish, in Japanese terms, are any 'Huna' bodied goldfish with a single tail (in reference to the popular common goldfish), double tail, or triple tail, while in the US, a wakin is simply a double tail goldfish with a long body. They are also seen in red and white, which are prized for competition. Other colors include chocolate, blue, red, white, orange, and yellow. There is also a calico wakin, but for some reason, in regards to its color process, the calico wakin is not considered a full-blooded wakin line.

== Breeding ==
Despite the fish's double tail, breeding is easy as long as young fish are cared for properly.

== Other types ==
The watonai goldfish is a cross between the wakin and the ryukin.

Ise Nishiki is a goldfish thought to be cross between the Sakura wakin and the Sakura ryukin.

== See also ==
- List of goldfish varieties
