= Meteor goldfish =

Breed of goldfish

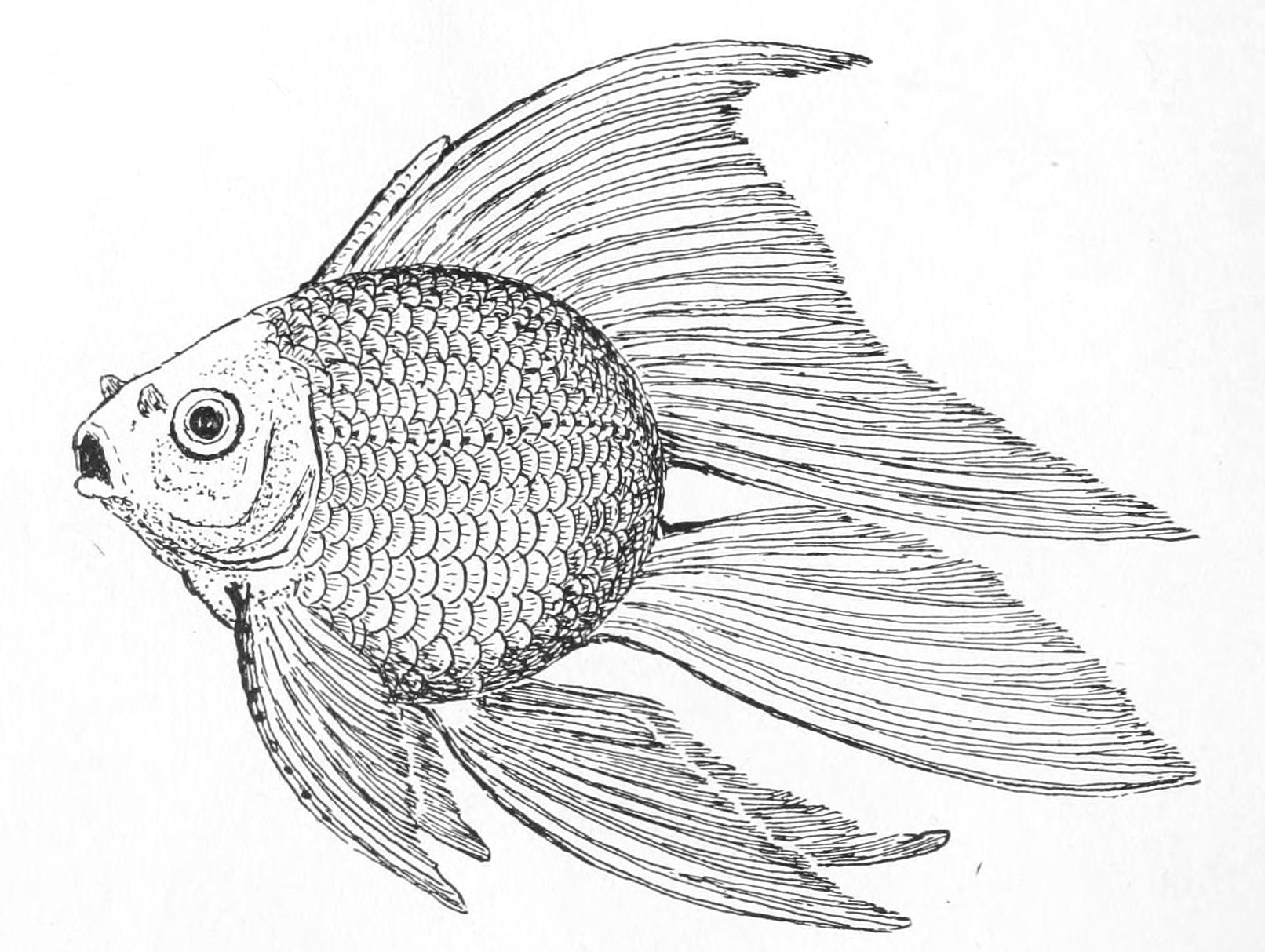
- Type: No tail

Classification
- BAS

External image
- Purported photo of a meteor goldfish

The meteor goldfish is considered the rarest breed of goldfish. They are a tailless form thought to have been developed by goldfish breeders during the late 19th or early 20th century. The meteor goldfish lack a tail fin, but have a well-developed anal fin in its position. The other fins of the meteor goldfish are elongated, and it is a competent swimmer despite its lack of a tail. Few swim like other normal goldfish and few swim straight ahead like a rocket, the rocket swimming being rarer. The meteor is also one of the hardest to breed, as they can be very weak, and in low temperatures sicken easily.
