= Calico (goldfish) =

Breed of goldfish

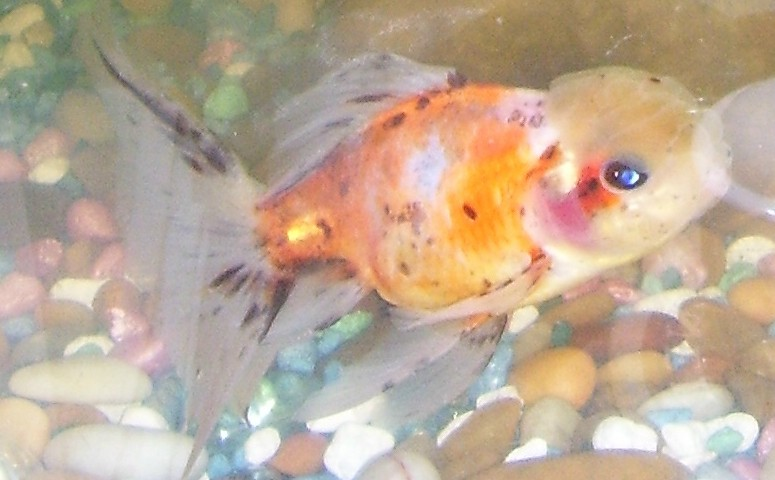
A calico oranda goldfish.

Calico goldfish are goldfish of any breed that have a type of scale that is intermediate between the metallic type of scales and the transparent type. These scales have a slight sheen that produces a pearly appearance. The name "calico goldfish" came about because the first fish that were introduced with this type of scales had a mottled calico pattern with several colours.

Calico goldfish often have patches of red, yellow, grey, and black along with dark speckles on a blue background. This coloration usually extends over the fins.

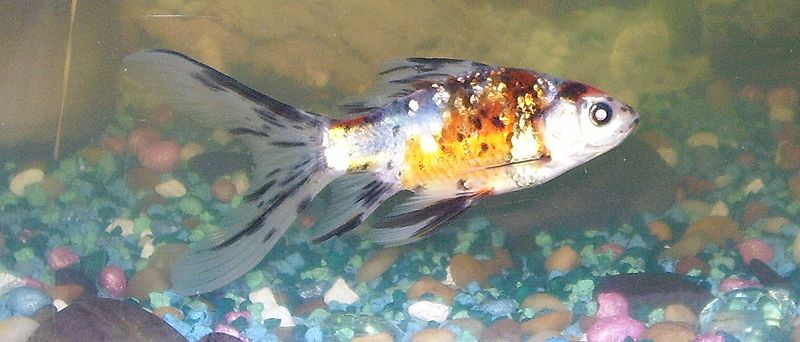
Shubunkins are well known for their calico coloration

Although calico coloration occurs in many fancy goldfish varieties such as telescope eyes, fantails, ryukins, orandas, and ranchu's, the nacreous scale characteristic is usually exclusive to the shubunkins, which are single-tailed fish that are similar to the common goldfish and could grow up to 12 inches in length.

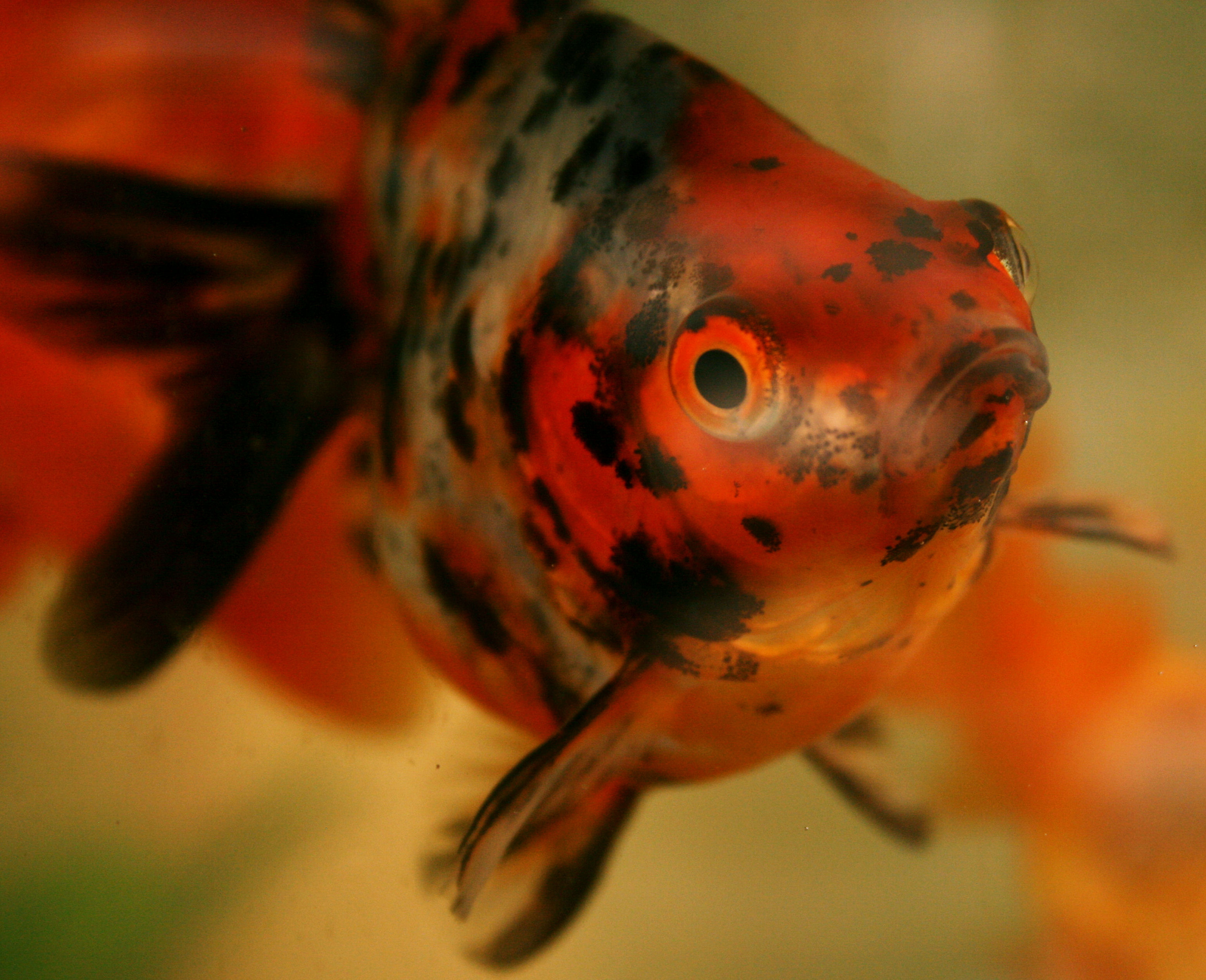
Calico Ryukin goldfish
