= Shubunkin =

Type of Japanese goldfish

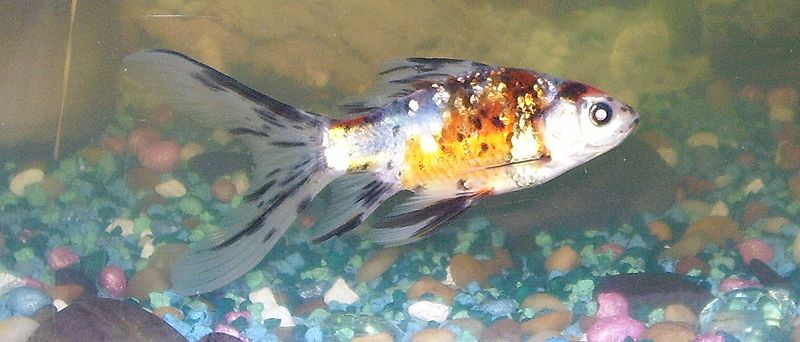
- American Shubunkin
- Other names: Harlequin goldfish
- Country of origin: Japan
- Type: Single tailed

Classification
- BAS

Shubunkin (Japanese: 朱文金, Hepburn: Shubunkin; 'vermilion brocade') are a hardy, single-tailed goldfish with nacreous scales and a pattern known as calico. They are of Japanese origin.

The Shubunkin was created by Akiyama Yoshigoro (ja:秋山吉五郎) by crossing Calico telescope eye with a Comet goldfish and a Common goldfish.

== Description ==
Shubunkin are similar to the common goldfish and comet goldfish in appearance. They were first bred in Japan, from crossbreeding the calico telescope eye goldfish (Demekins), comet goldfish, and the common goldfish c. 1900. They have streamlined bodies with well-developed and even fins. However, the Shubunkins are calico goldfish; they possess nacreous scales (an intermediate between metallic and transparent scales that are pearly in appearance). The overlapping patches of red, white, blue, grey and black (along with dark speckles) normally extend to the finnage of Shubunkins. Blue is the most prized colour in Shubunkins. Calico originally denoted three coloured varieties of goldfish that did not include blue. The best blues are produced from line breeding of good blue specimens of Shubunkins. Sometimes good blues may be obtained by breeding bronze (metallic) with "pink" (matte-scaled) goldfish, but a grey slate colour may result instead.

It may take several months for the nacreous coloration to develop on a young fry (baby fish). Shubunkins are excellent pond fish because they reach a length of 9 to 18 inches (23 to 46 cm) at adulthood. A Shubunkin goldfish is considered an adult at 1 to 2 years of age, even though they live much longer. With proper diet and water conditions, the average lifespan of a Shubunkin goldfish is around 10–15 years.

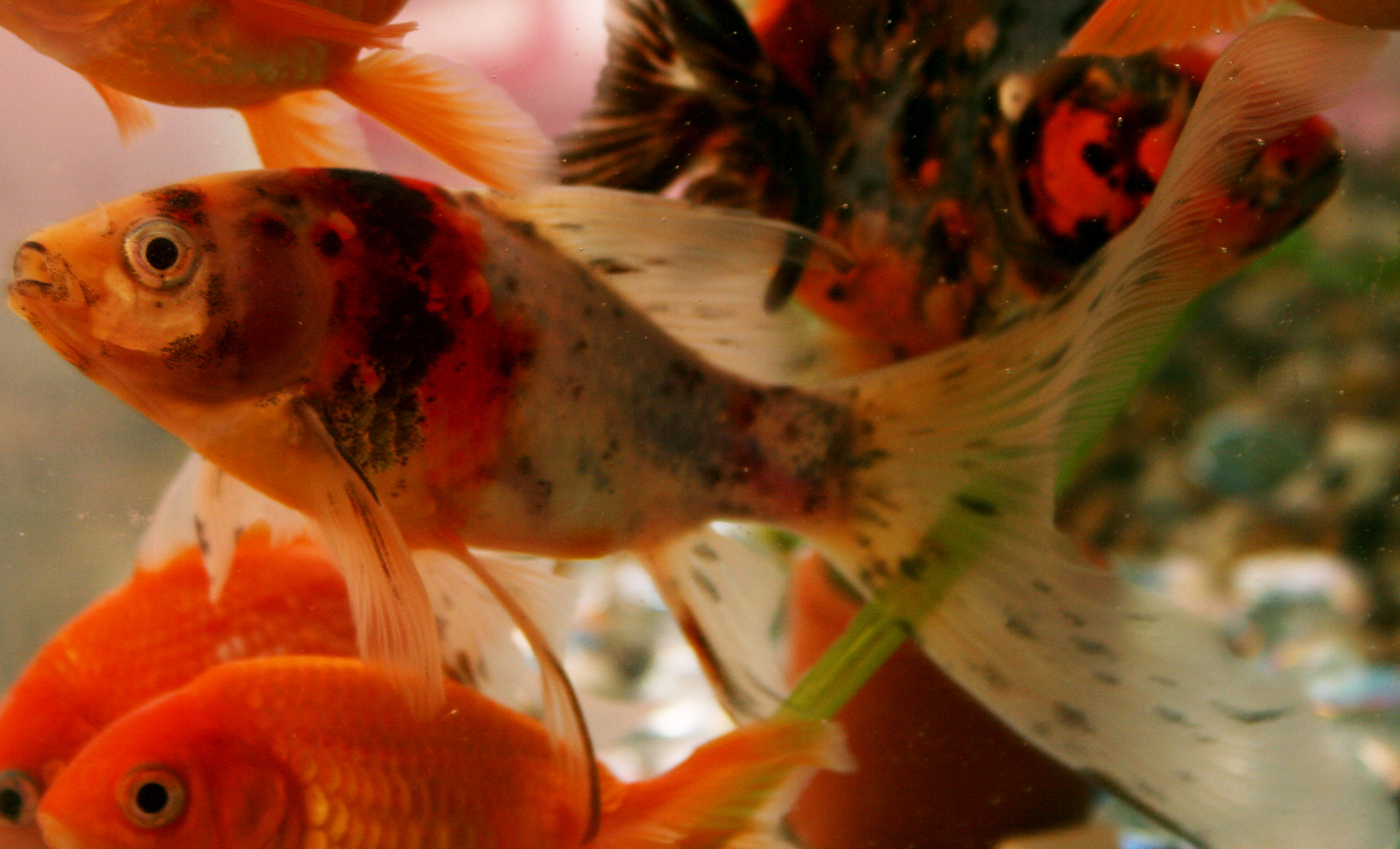
Male Shubunkin

== Genetics ==
Blue colouring in goldfish comes from black pigment within the body wall. It will not show as blue in fish with metallic type scales, but will look blue if the fish has matte or nacreous scales. The nacreous (formerly called calico) scale type is produced in a fish that carries the gene for metallic scales, as well as the gene for matte scales (the fish is heterozygous). Only nacreous scales are accepted by the Shubunkin breed standards.

- When two fish with nacreous scales breed together, the offspring will on average include 1/4 with metallic scales, 1/4 with matte scales, and 1/2 with nacreous scales.
- If a fish with nacreous scales breeds with a fish with metallic scales, the offspring will on average include 1/2 metallic and 1/2 nacreous.
- If a fish with nacreous scales breeds with a fish with matte scales, the offspring will on average include 1/2 matte and 1/2 nacreous.
- If a fish with metallic scales breeds with a fish with matte scales, the offspring will all be nacreous.

== Variants ==
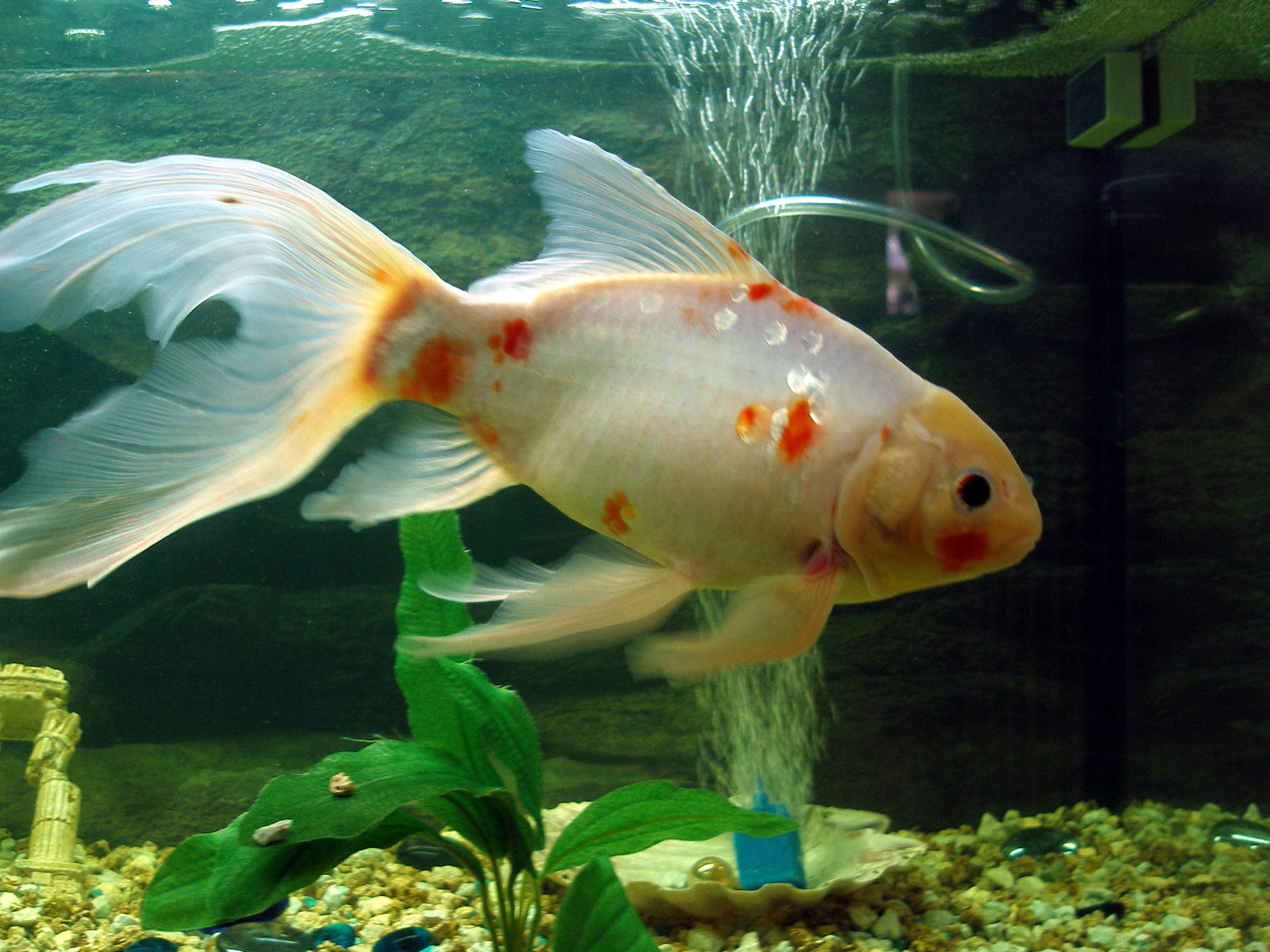
An adult American/Japanese Shubunkin, 26 cm (10 in) in length

- London Shubunkins have stout bodies and short, rounded finnage that is similar to the common goldfish.
- American Shubunkins (pictured in infobox), also called "Japanese Shubunkins", have a slimmer body shape than the London Shubunkin, with deeply forked, pointed tail fins, and longer finnage all around. They are the most frequently seen type of shubunkins and the most common kind of shubunkins in many fish stores and markets.
- Bristol Shubunkins are a long broad-bodied goldfish with well-developed finnage, possessing a tail that is exaggeratingly large, moderately forked, and rounded at the end, making a shape similar to that of a heart or the capitalization of the letter "B". They are the rarest shubunkins, hardly in stores, and few are in the US. The name Bristol shubunkin comes from the city in Britain where they were originally bred.
