= Fantail (goldfish) =

Breed of goldfish

Fantail goldfish
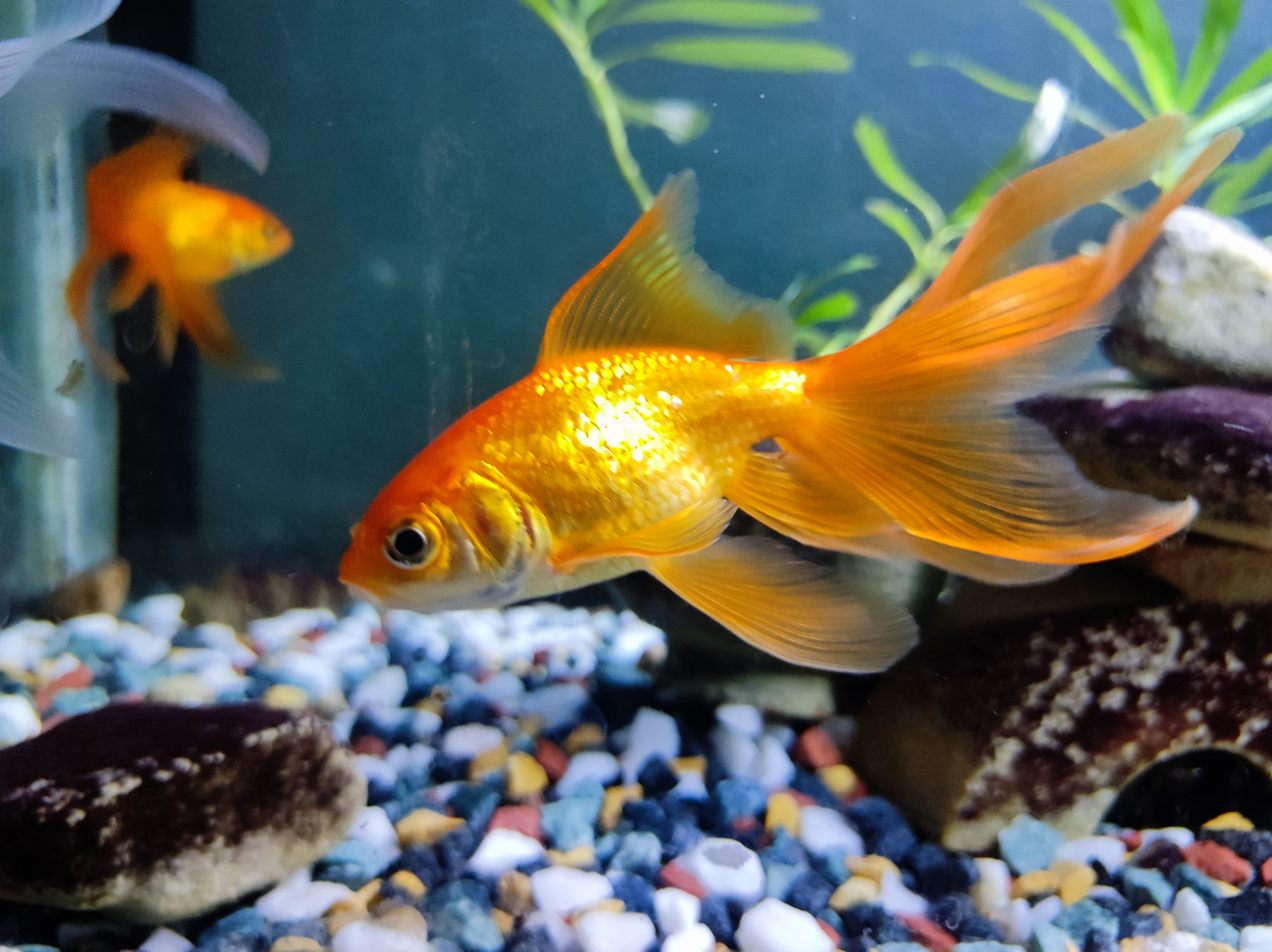
- Country of origin: China and Japan (Asia)
- Type: Fantailed

Classification
- BAS

The Fantail is a goldfish that possesses an egg-shaped body, a high dorsal fin, a long quadruple caudal fin, and no shoulder hump. It is similar to the Ryukin, and is relatively common in western countries. The Fantail Goldfish is the base for many fancy goldfish varieties.

== Description ==
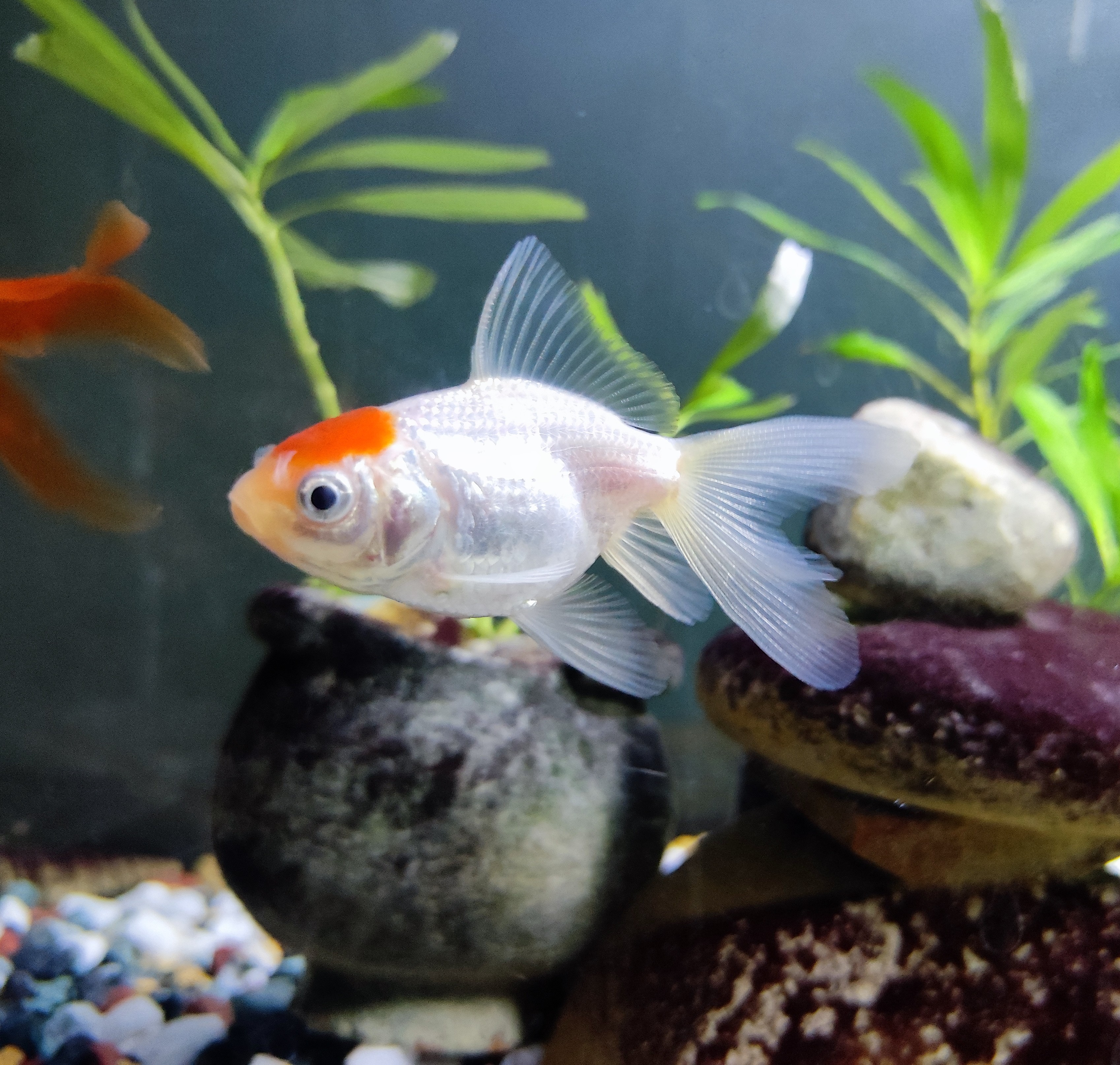
A redcap fantail goldfish

The Fantail goldfish may have either metallic or nacreous scales and normal or telescope eyes. Telescope eyes do not develop until the fish is 6 months old. Its fins are less developed than the Ryukin. It supports double anal and tail fins. The anal and caudal fins are well divided into two matching halves. Although generally considered a hardy goldfish, Fantails can be sensitive to prolonged exposure to low water temperatures. Keeping Fantails in an aquarium requires an ideal temperature of 73 to 74 °F (23 °C)

== Breeding ==
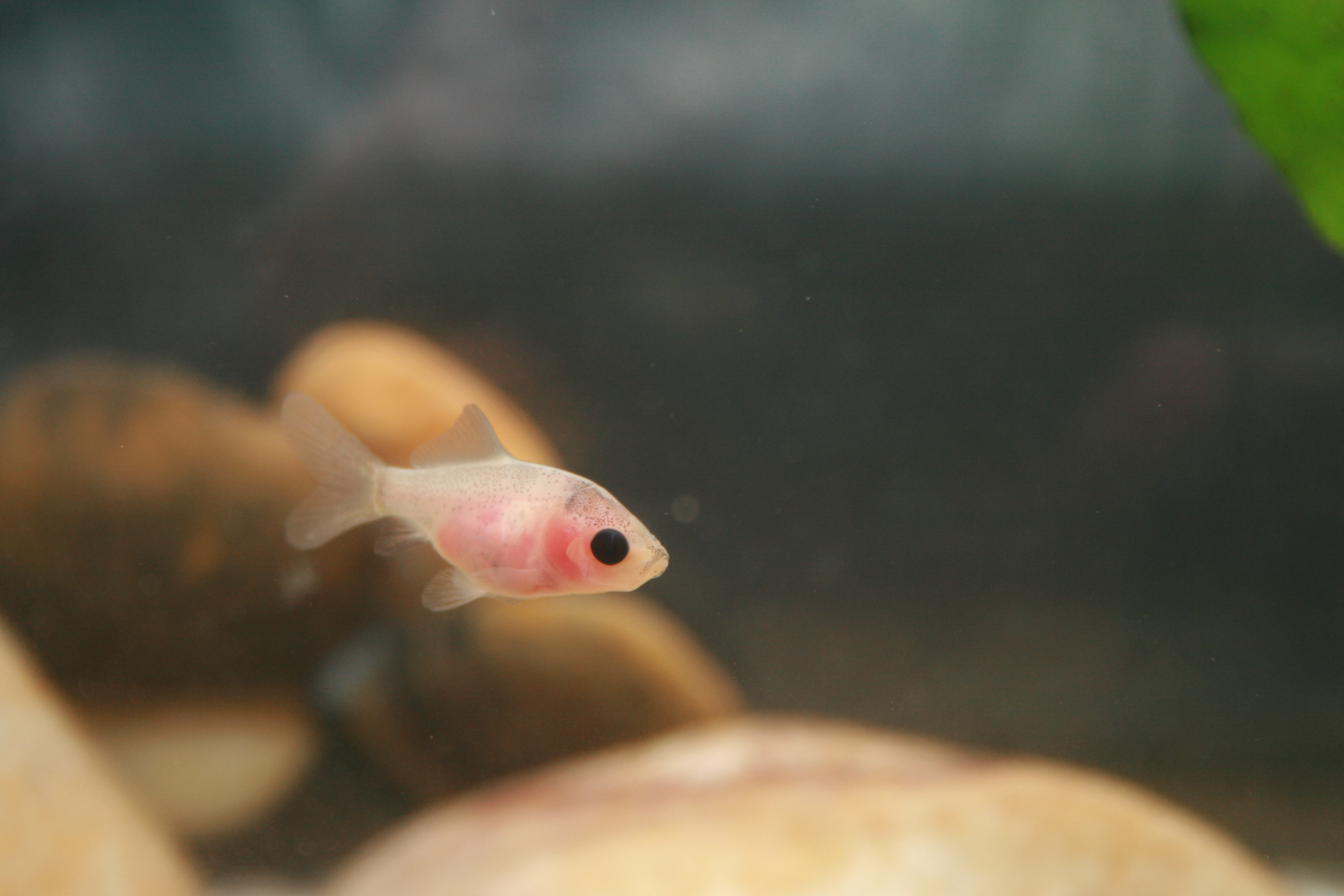
A baby goldfish

Good-quality Fantails are produced by rigorous fry selection. Fantails can be very easy to breed.

== Reproduction ==
Goldfish in general are an appropriate ideal fish for the study of reproductive performance due to its availability and the obtaining of a large number of eggs from a single female fish. Healthy goldfish eggs look like small and clear bubbles. It can range in color from white to yellow-orange. Whereas dead eggs are pale yellow. Eggs of fantail goldfish are adhesive, meaning they can easily stick to surfaces.

== See also ==
- Ryukin
