= List of goldfish varieties =

Assorted goldfish

This is a list of goldfish varieties and their characteristics. Currently, there are about 200 breeds of goldfish recognized in China.

Selective breeding of goldfish over centuries has produced several color variations, some of them far removed from the "golden" color of the original fish. There are also different body shapes, fin, and eye configurations. Some extreme versions of the goldfish live only in aquariums—they are much less hardy than varieties closer to the "wild" original. However, some variations are hardier, such as the Shubunkin. The vast majority of goldfish breeds today originated from China. Some of the main varieties are:

== Single-tailed varieties ==
Single tailed varieties have a single caudal fin and anal fin. They have long, streamlined bodies and are faster swimming than shorter egg-shaped goldfishes. They all come from common goldfish, but rare egg-shaped varieties like nymph goldfish are developed from egg-shaped goldfish. They have no telescopic eyes, celestial eyes, nor bubble eyes. They have no headgrowths like orandas, lionheads, and ranchus, narial bouquets like pompoms, or curled gills like curled-gill.

=== Long-bodied ===
- Common goldfish - It is the most common type of goldfish, hence the name. All varieties of goldfish are developed from this variety. It is the direct descendant of the wild Carassius auratus. It is also known as a feeder fish or feeder goldfish. Common goldfish come in a variety of colors including red, orange, blueish-grey, brown, yellow, white, and black. The most common variation is a shiny orange, with the second most common variation being a mix of white and red or orange and white. Although the color black is uncommon, yellow and black/white color pattern (trademarked as 'pandas') are rare.

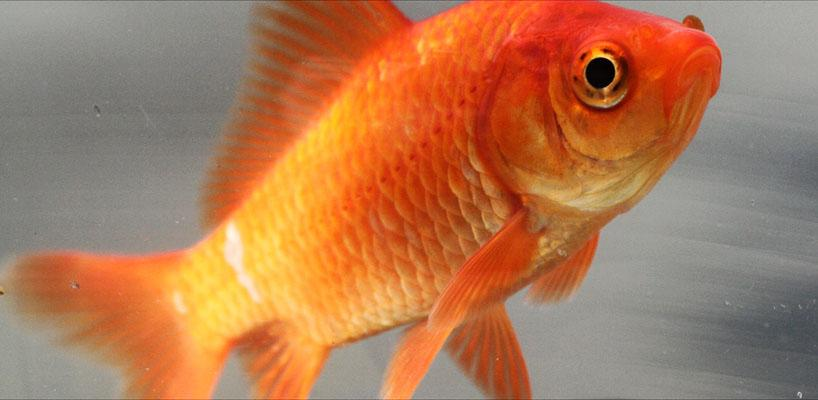

- Comet goldfish - This is the most common goldfish variety in the United States. It is similar to the common goldfish, except for a long, deeply-forked tail, and the rest of its fins are long. It was developed in the United States from the common goldfish.

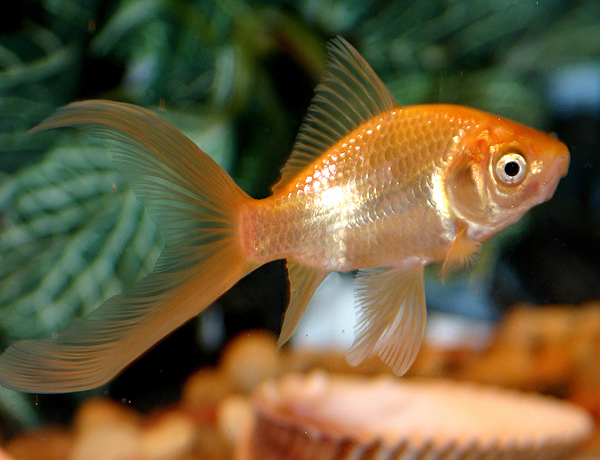

- Shubunkin - It is a hardy, Japanese single-tailed goldfish variety with nacreous scales and a mottled pattern known as calico.
  - London Shubunkins - It has a stout body and short, rounded finnage that is similar to the common goldfish.
  - American Shubunkins - It has a slimmer body shape than the London Shubunkin with deeply forked, pointed tail fins and longer finnage all around. Its appearance is similar to the comet goldfish.
  - Bristol Shubunkins - It is a slim-bodied goldfish with well-developed finnage, possessing a tail that is large, moderately forked, and rounded at the end. It has a large heart-shaped tail.

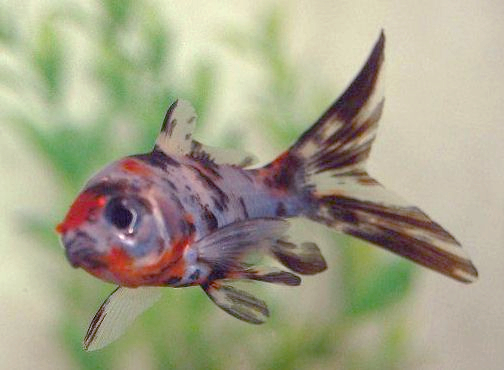

=== Egg-shaped bodied ===
- Nymph goldfish - It is similar to the fantail, except they have a single caudal fin and anal fin. Considered a byproduct of the breeding process due to recessive genes handed down from fantail or veiltail parents.
- Tamasaba goldfish (or Sabao goldfish) - It is similar to the ryukin, except they have a single caudal fin and anal fin. A rare type of fish mutated from the ryukins. It is developed from the ryukin.

== Double-tailed varieties ==
Double-tailed or "fancy" goldfish. Fancy, in goldfish, meaning they have double caudal fins and anal fins. They are the most popular and the most expensive types of goldfish. There are two types of fancy goldfish:

=== Streamlined bodied ===
- Wakin goldfish - It is a Japanese variety similar to the common goldfish, except it has double caudal fins and anal fins. All fancy goldfish are developed from this variety. The wakin was developed from the common goldfish.
- Watonai goldfish - It is similar to the comet goldfish, except it has double caudal fins and anal fins. The watonai was developed both from the wakin and ryukin goldfish.
- Jikin goldfish - A Japanese fancy goldfish variety that has its double caudal fins splay outwards. Jikin goldfish have strictly two colors (red and white) and perfect individuals display a unique pattern called the '12 points of red'. It is like a wakin, but the caudal fins are spread apart. The jikin is developed from the wakin.

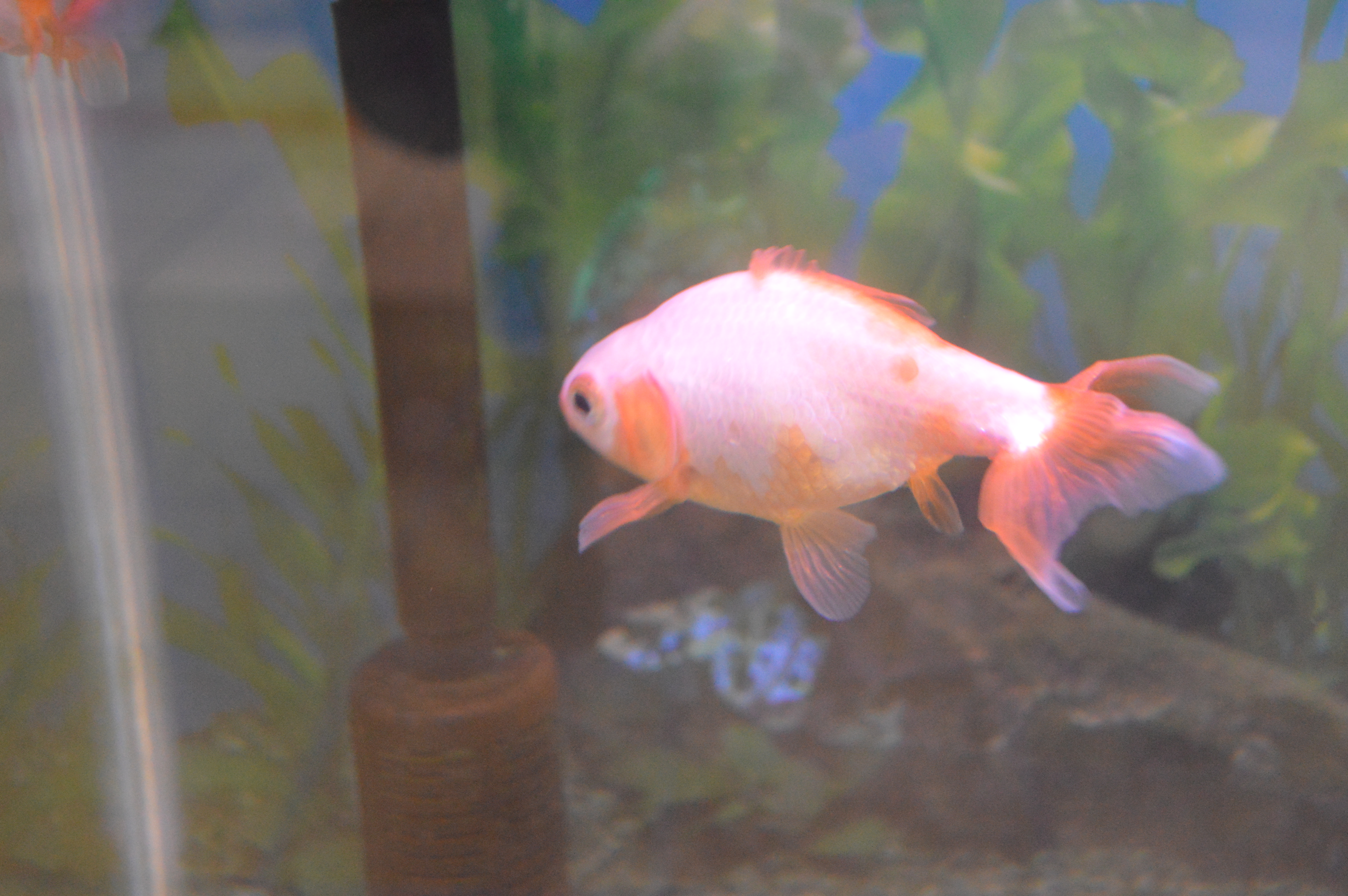

=== Egg-shaped bodied ===
Egg-shaped goldfish is the most popular type of goldfish. They have two types:

==== Dorsal finned varieties ====
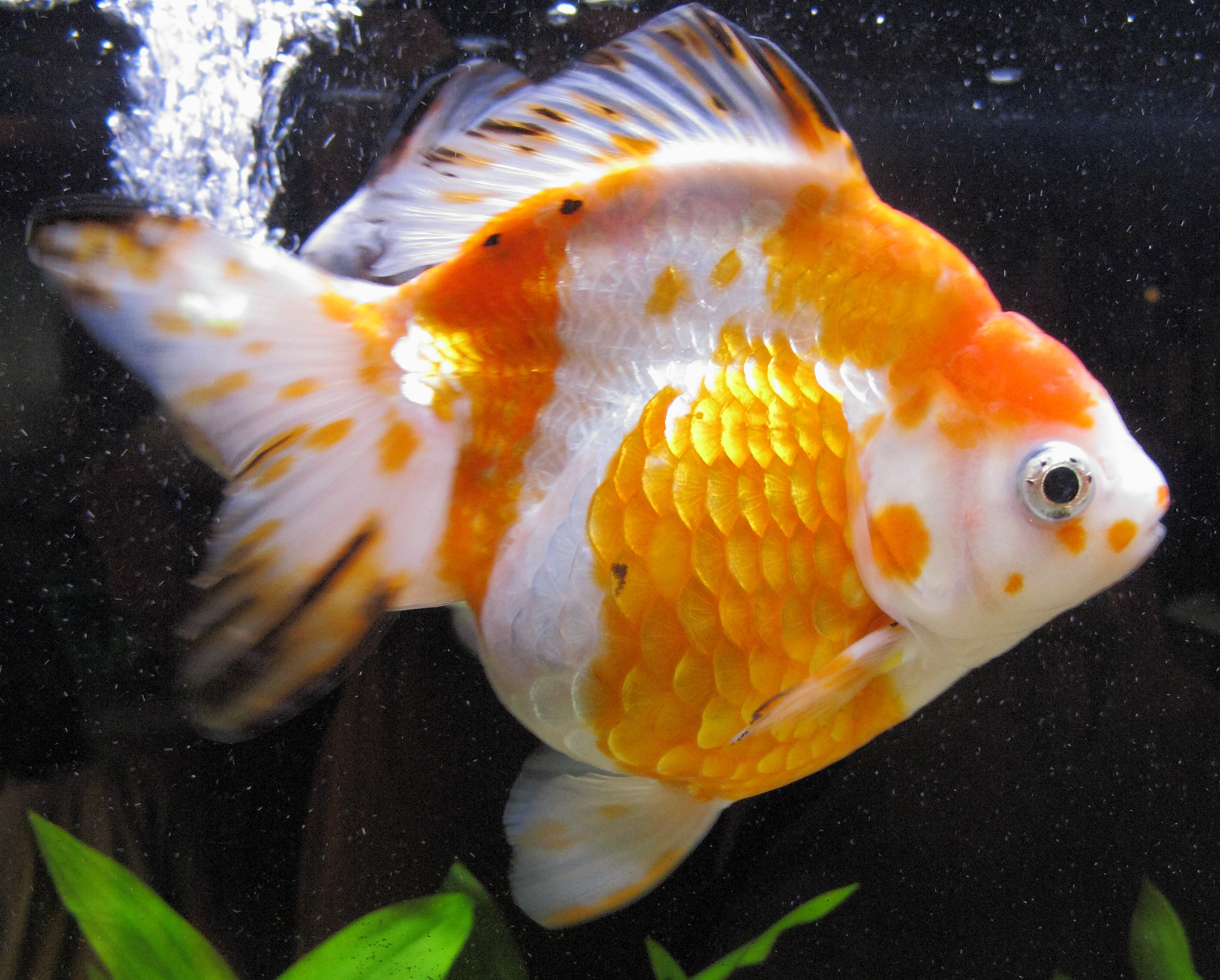
Orange-white Ryukin goldfish

- Fantail goldfish - It is the western form of the ryukin and possesses an egg-shaped body, a high dorsal fin, double caudal and anal fins, and no shoulder hump.

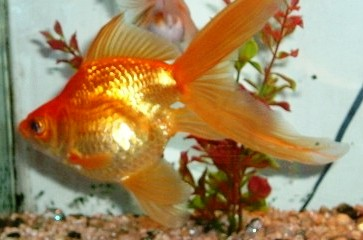

- Veiltail goldfish - It is similar to the fantail goldfish, except that they have longer fins. They have long tails and fins which resemble a veil and cause them to be slow-moving. They are prone to fin nipping because many other fish are attracted to their long flowing fins. The veiltail is the long-finned version of the fantail goldfish.

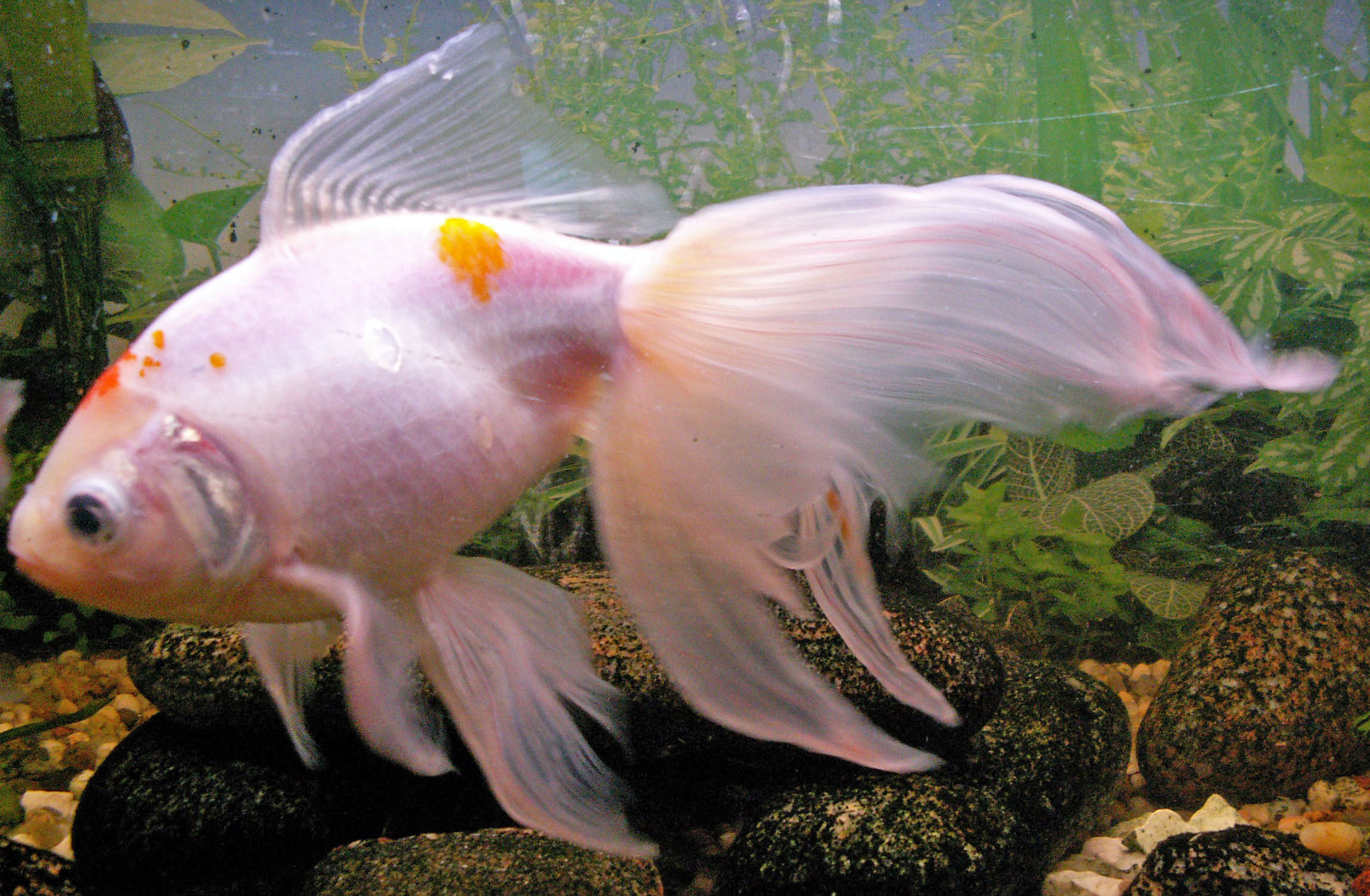

- Ryukin goldfish - It has a short, deep body with a characteristic shoulder hump. It is similar to the fantail goldfish, except with a shoulder hump. Its name is derived from the Ryukyu Islands, where they have been bred. Since they have a larger hump, an aquarium that is taller than most fancy goldfishes require is needed.

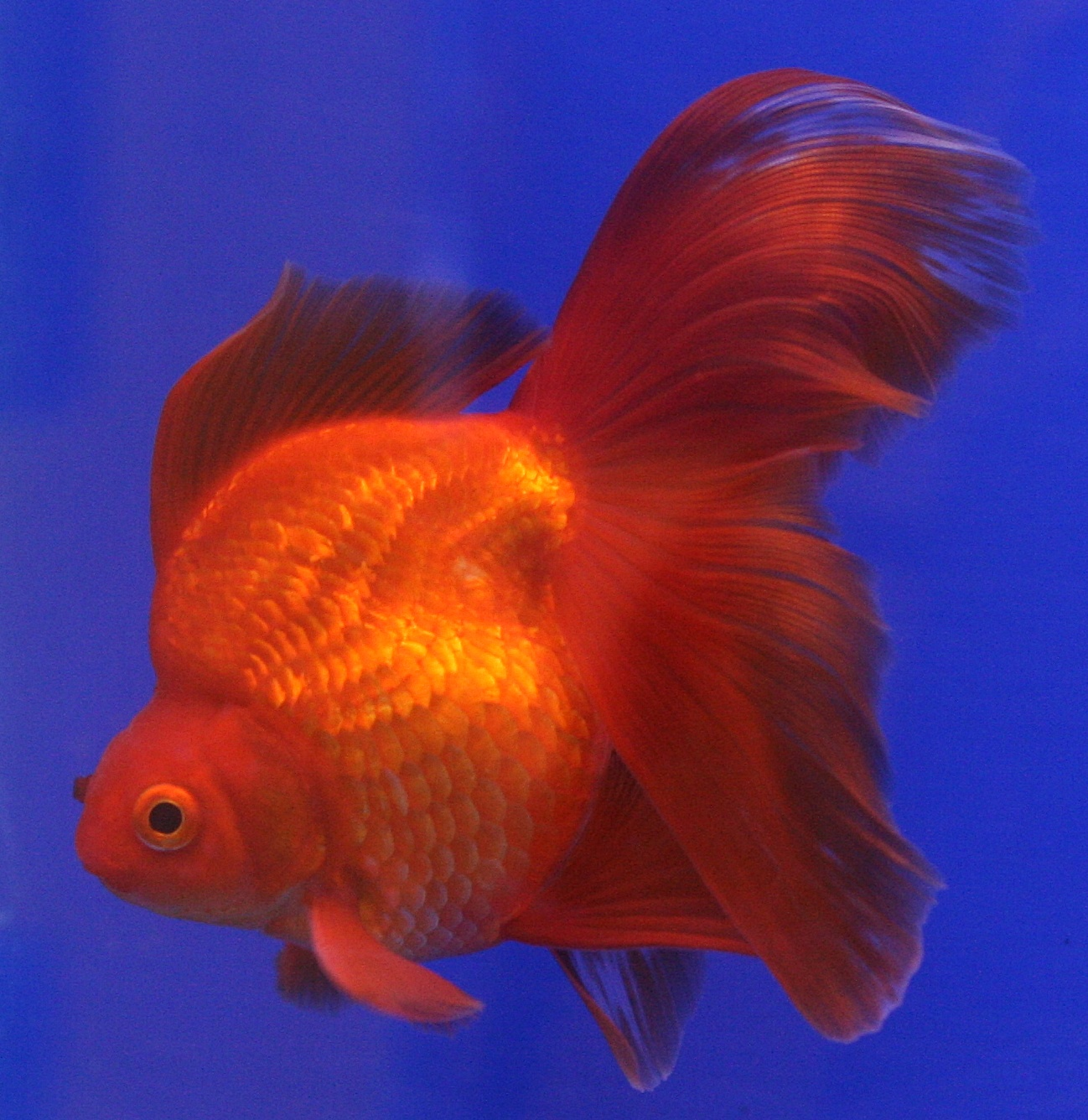

- Pearlscale goldfish - It is a spherical-bodied goldfish with finnage similar to the fantail goldfish. It has a shorter and rounder body compared to other goldfish. Due to the sphere-shaped body, they are very susceptible to constipation, and their food shouldn't contain air. They have whitish pearl-like raised scales that look attractive to many people. When their scales fall off, they will grow only into regular scales. They should not be kept in an aquarium with rough objects that can cause their scales to fall off.

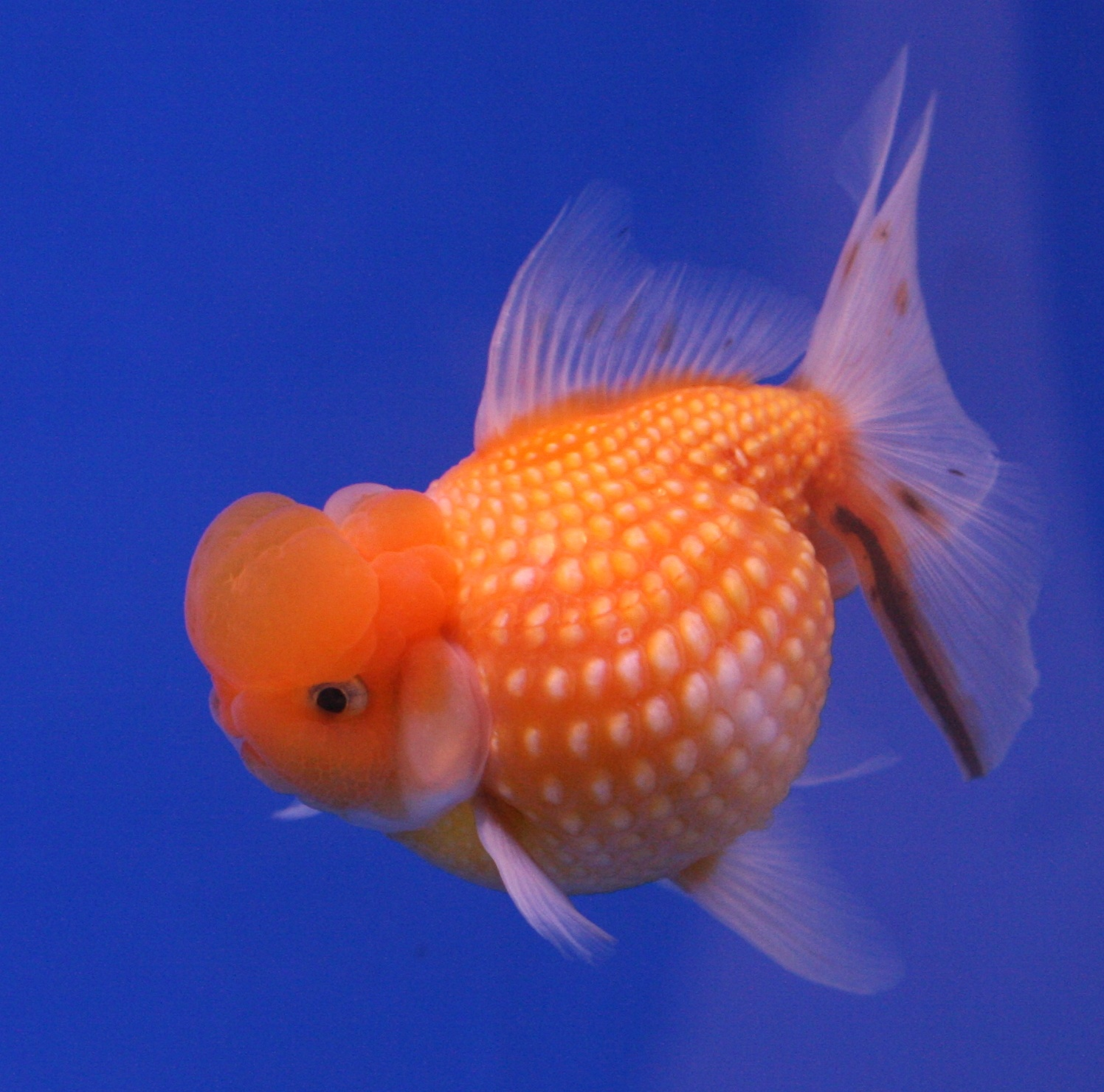

- Tamasaba - It is an uncommon Japanese variety of goldfish with a body shaped similar to the Ryukin and a very long, flowing, single tail that is similar to that of a comet goldfish, hence its other name, comet-tail ryukin.

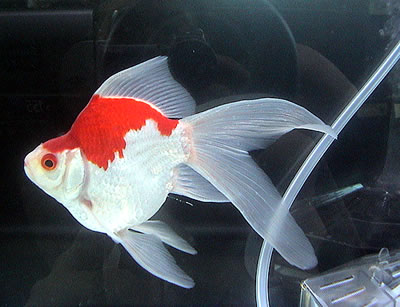

- Telescope goldfish - It is similar to fantails, except that it has protruding eyes. Because of this, it has zoomed, thus limited, vision and should not be kept in an aquarium with rough objects that can harm or even can cause blindness to their protruding eyes. Black telescopes are often referred to as black moors and many people differentiate them from telescope goldfish; black moors have a velvety black or black matte body and broader, longer and more deeply forked tails, while telescopes do not come in black. Some people consider black moors a separate variety of goldfish, but this is usually rejected. In addition, black moors are often not called black moors; instead, they are called black telescopes because black moors are only different in color. Most bred telescope goldfish have a dorsal fin but some individuals don't have one.
- Demekin goldfish - It is similar to the telescope goldfish, except that it has a short, deep body with a characteristic shoulder hump like the ryukin goldfish. Since they have a larger hump, an aquarium that is taller than most fancy goldfishes require is needed.

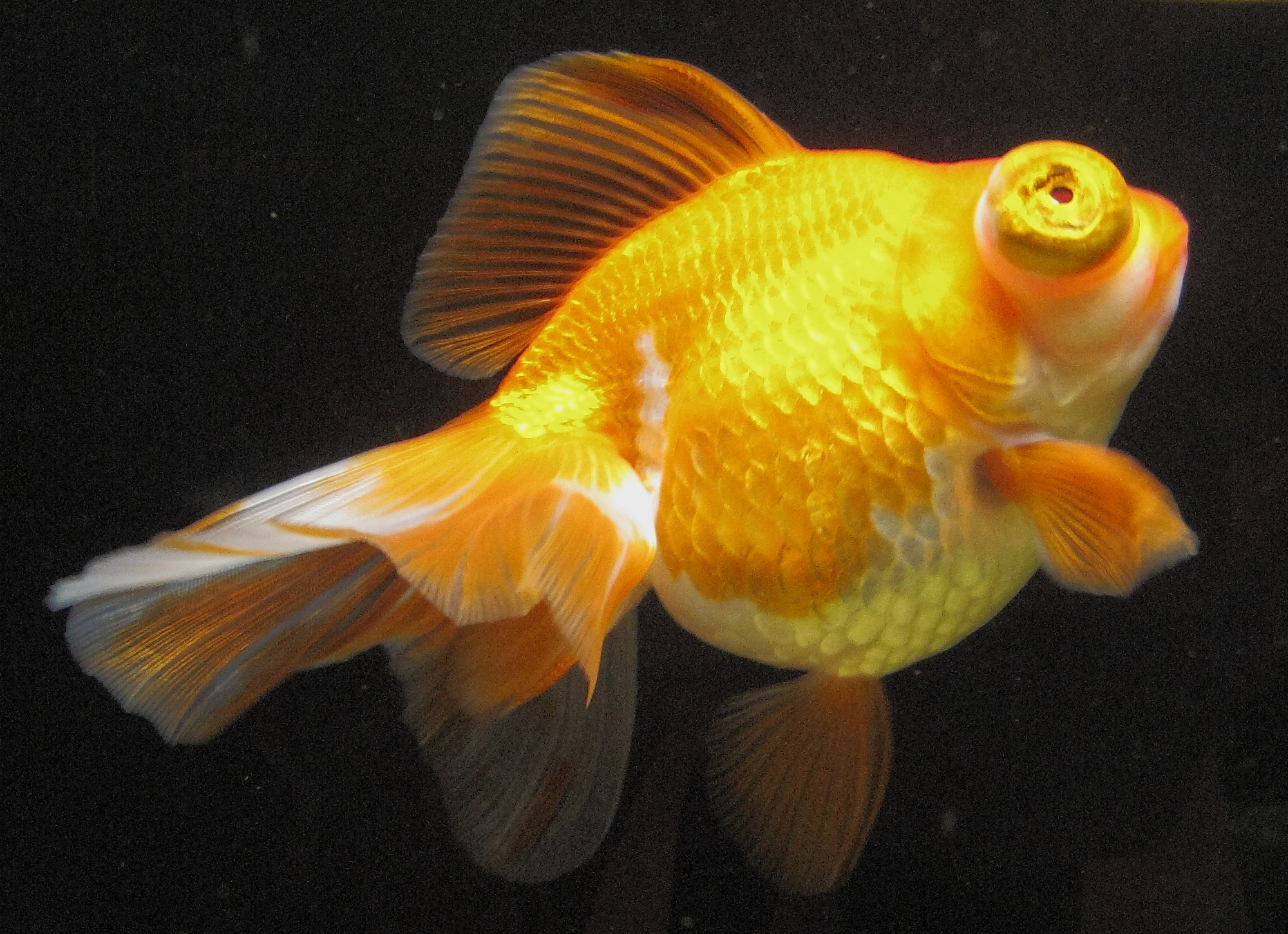

- Oranda goldfish - It is characterized by a prominent raspberry-like hood (also known as wen or head growth) that encases the whole head except for the eyes and mouth. It is similar to the fantail goldfish, except for the head growth. Orandas should not be kept in an aquarium with rough objects that can harm their head growths, which in turn can cause infection.

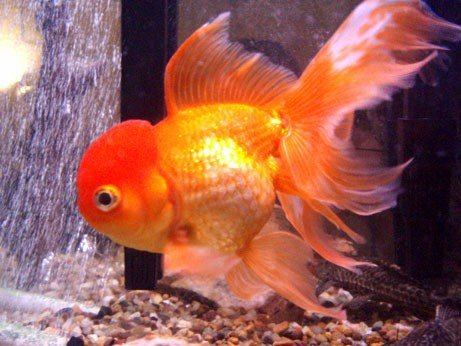

- Curled-gill goldfish - It is any goldfish type with curled-gills or with gills that are turned outwards. It is an uncommon variety of fancy goldfish that has been developed by specialist enthusiasts. It owes its name from the out-turned appearance of its gill covers.

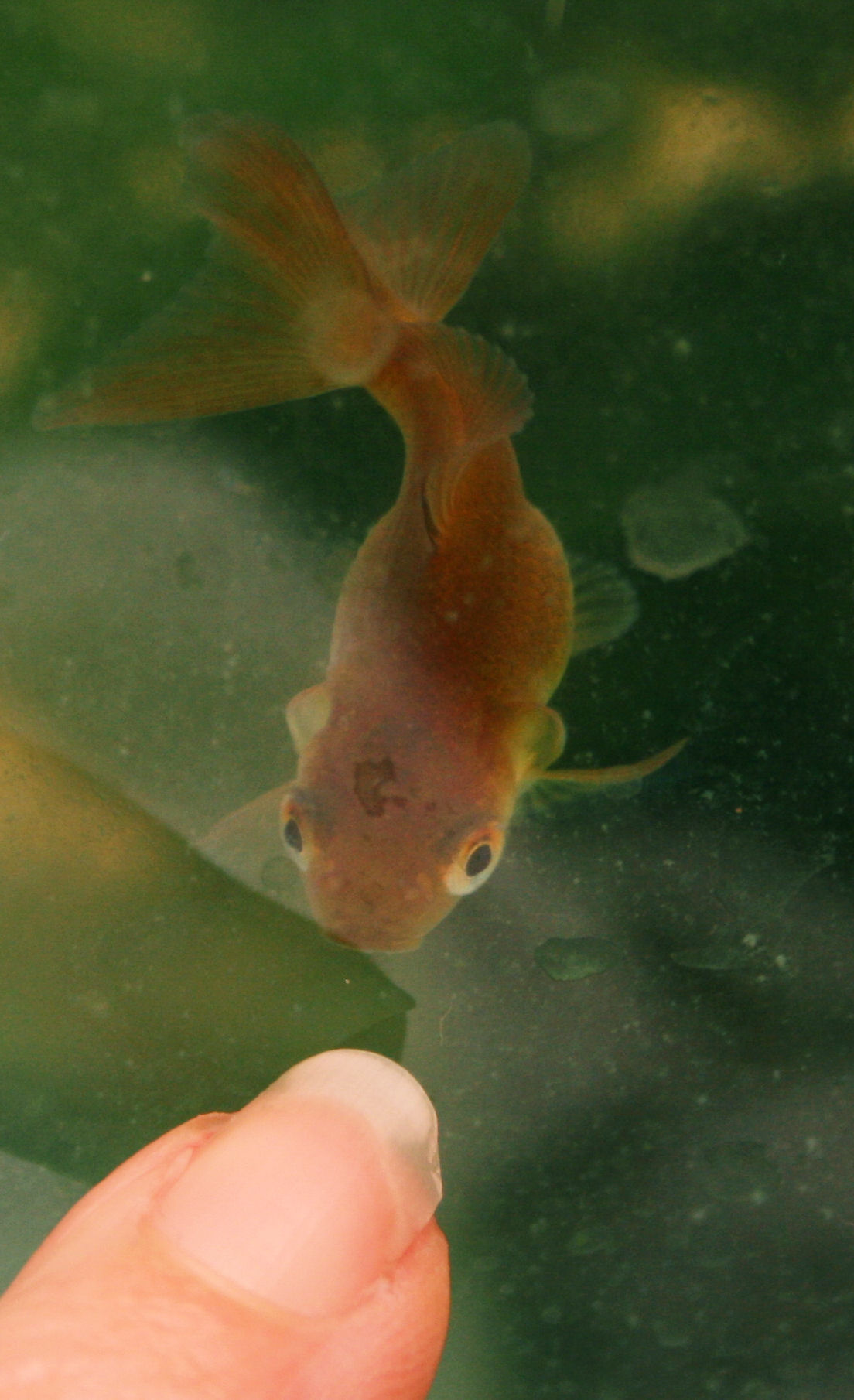

- Tosakin goldfish - It is the only fancy goldfish type with undivided double tail fins that curls their tails at the ends. It is a very distinctive Japanese breed of goldfish with a large tail fin that spreads out horizontally (like a fan) behind the fish. Though technically a divided tail, the two halves are attached at the center, forming a single fin.

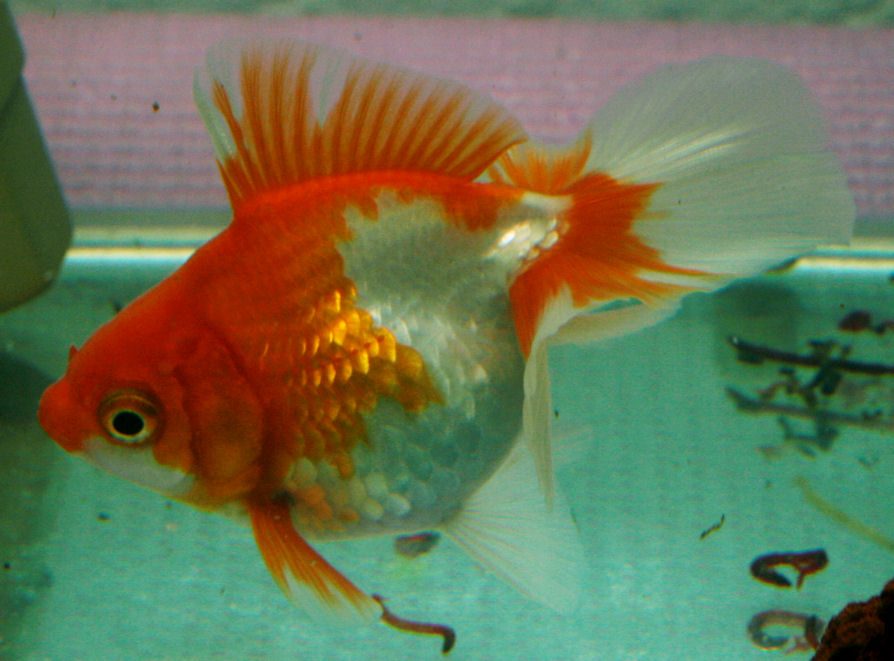

- Butterfly telescope goldfish - It is any fancy goldfish that is distinguished by the butterfly-shaped caudal fins when viewed from above.

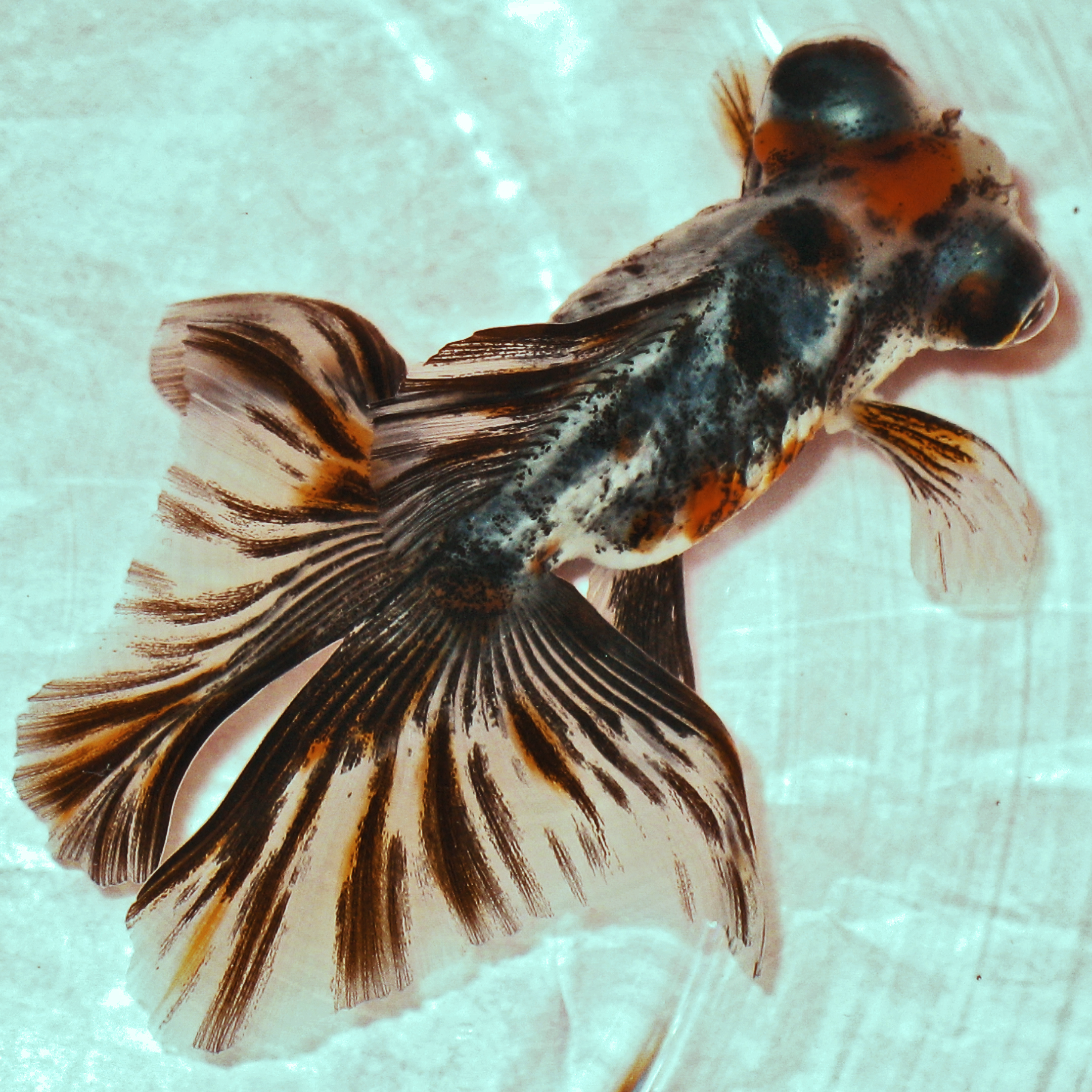

- Meteor goldfish - A tailess breed with a well-developed anal fin. It is a competent swimmer despite its lack of a tail.

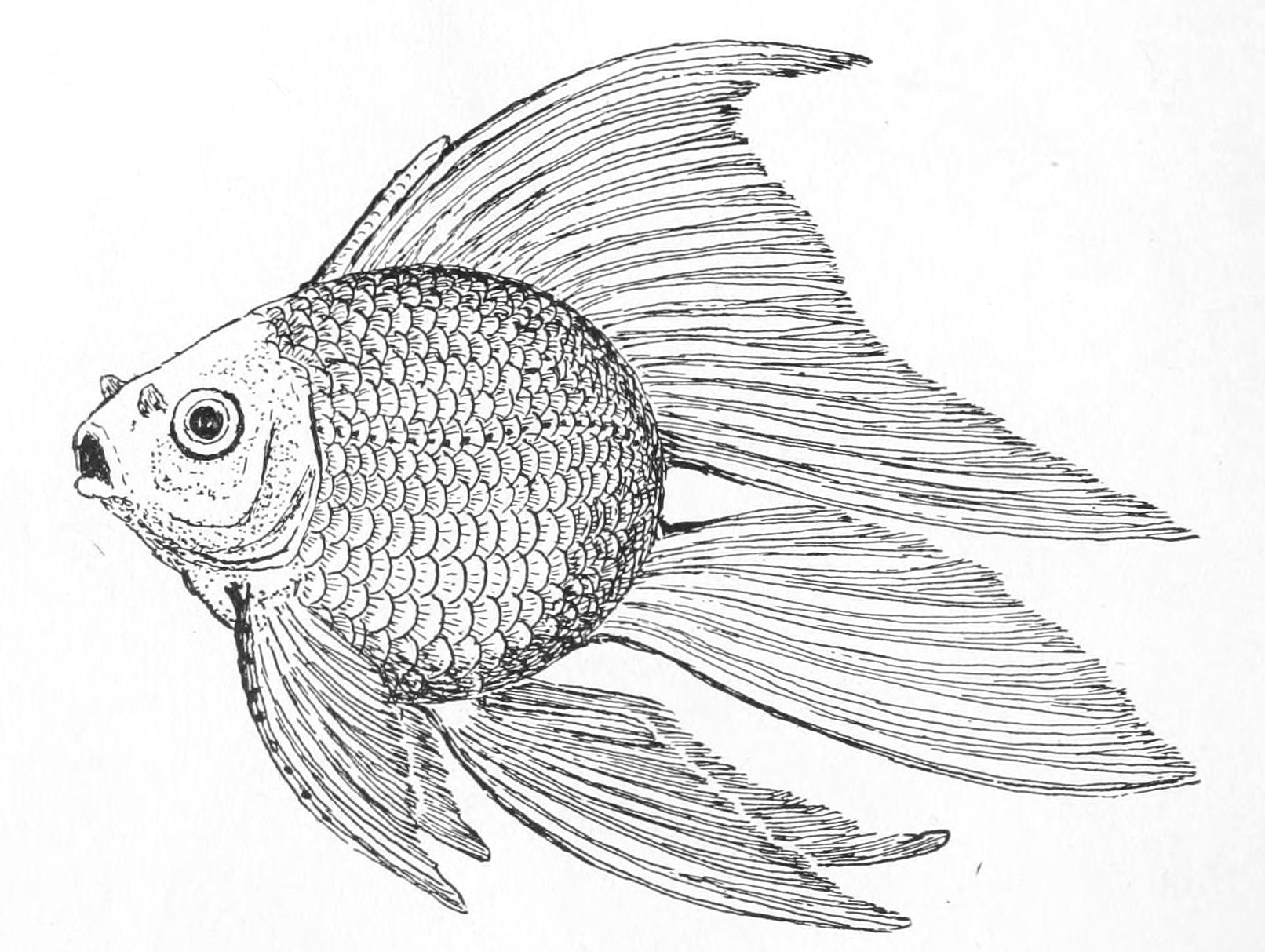

==== Dorsal finless varieties ====
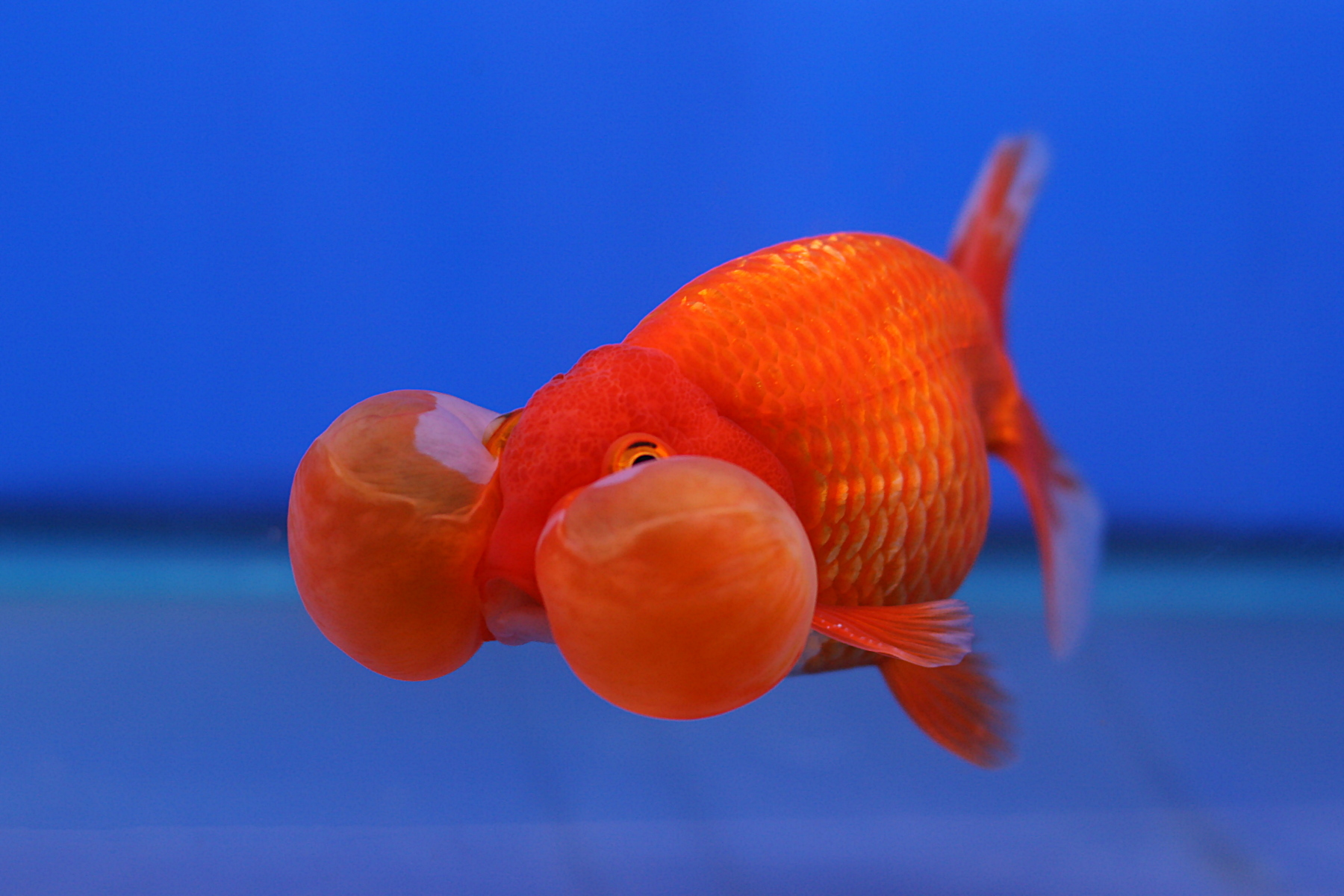
Bubble eye goldfish

- Egg-fish goldfish - It is similar to the fantail except that it has no dorsal fin. It is developed from the fantail.

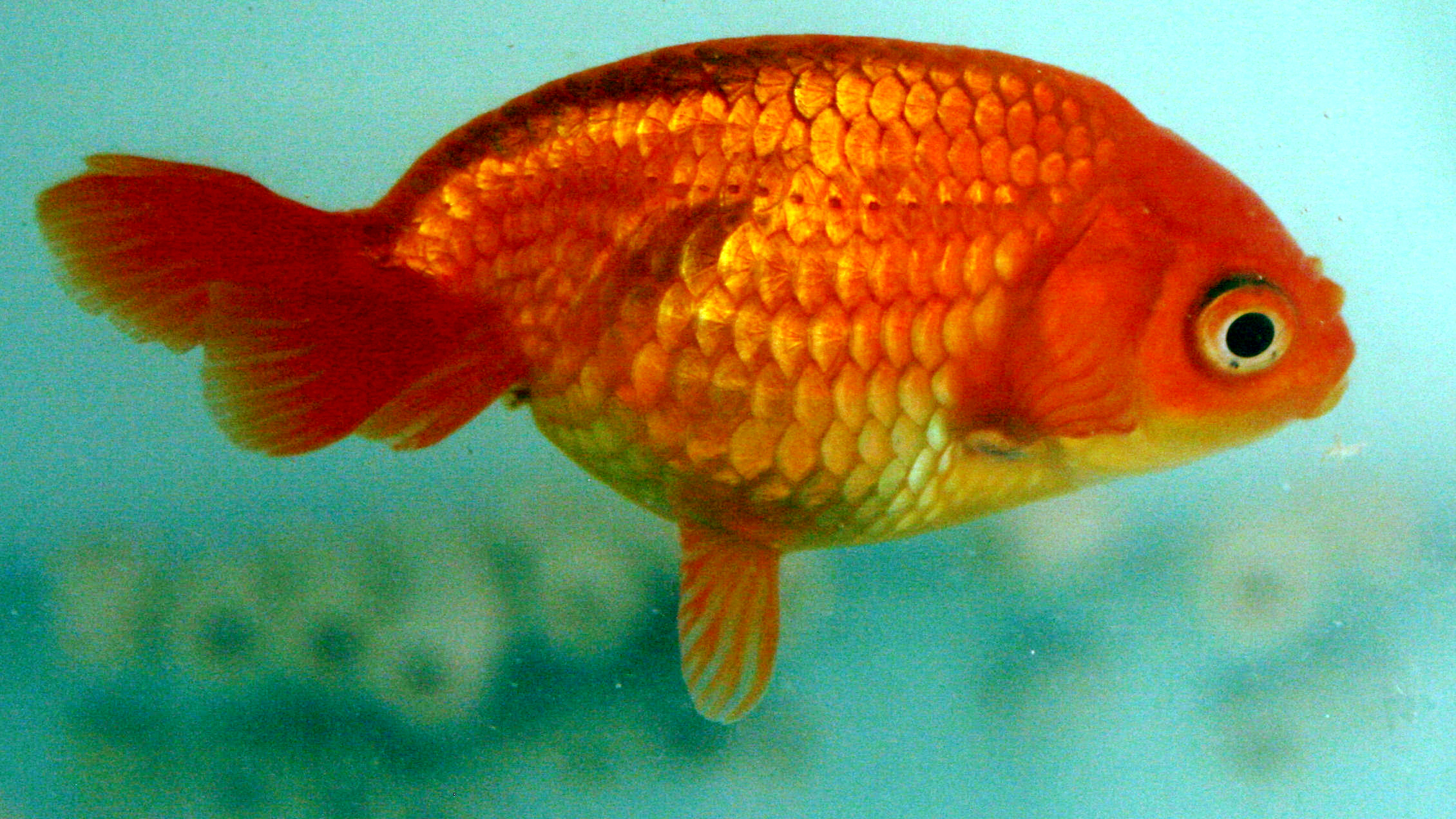

- Phoenix goldfish - It is similar to the eggfish, except that they have longer fins. It is developed from the eggfish goldfish. They have long tails and fins that resemble a veil and cause them to be slow-moving. They are prone to fin nipping because many other fish are attracted to their long flowing fins. Phoenix is the long-tailed version of the eggfish goldfish. It is the veiltail equivalent of the dorsal finless goldfish.
- Izumo Nankin goldfish - This Japanese goldfish breed is similar to the ryukin goldfish, except it has no dorsal fin. It has a short, deep body with a characteristic shoulder hump. It is similar to the eggfish goldfish, except with a shoulder hump. Since they have a larger hump, an aquarium that is taller than most fancy goldfishes require is needed.
- Pompom goldfish - It is similar to the eggfish goldfish, except it has larger nasal septa. They are called "pompoms" resembling the cheerleader's pompom balls. It is developed from the eggfish, though there are pompom goldfishes that have a dorsal fin.

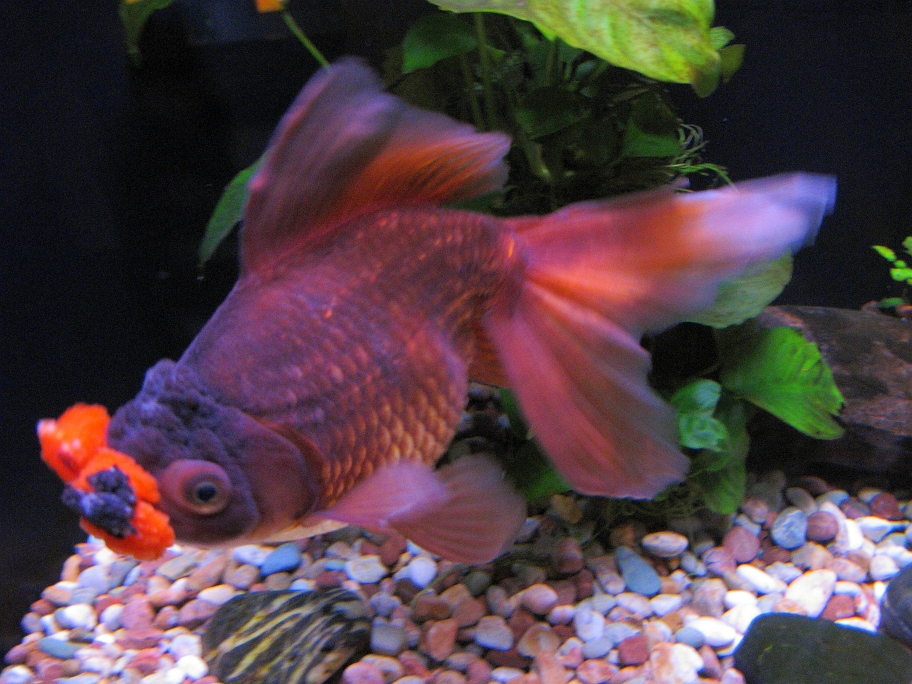

- Lionhead goldfish - It is similar to the eggfish goldfish, but with a head growth or wen similar to oranda goldfish, except that it has no dorsal fin. It has a soft, spongy head growth and should not be kept in an aquarium with rough objects that can harm its head growth, which may cause infection. It is developed from the eggfish goldfish.

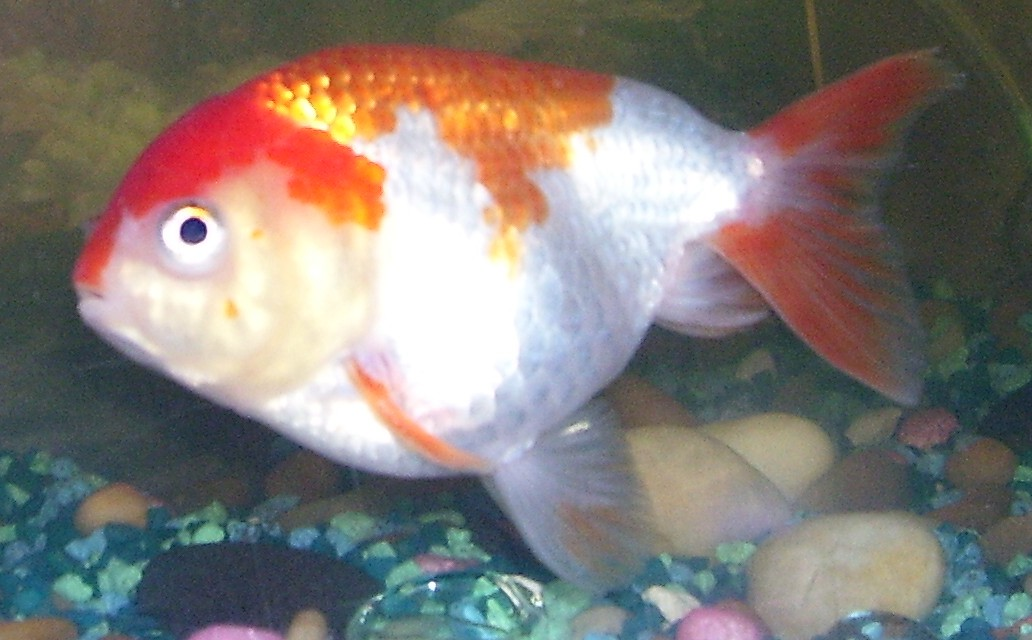

- Lionchu - Developed from crossbreeding lionheads and ranchus, this variety of goldfish that has been developed in Thailand. Thus, it has a deep body, broad and curved back, and tail placement has been merged with the large headgrowth of the lionhead. Like both their parent breeds, they lack a dorsal fin.

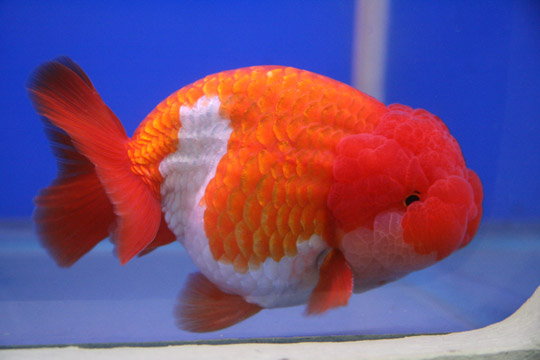

- Ranchu goldfish - This goldfish was Developed in Japan, and compared to lionheads, ranchus have a more downturned tail and tail fin. Although similar to lionheads, ranchus have more arched backs and have much shorter tails that are tucked in at a 45-degree angle.

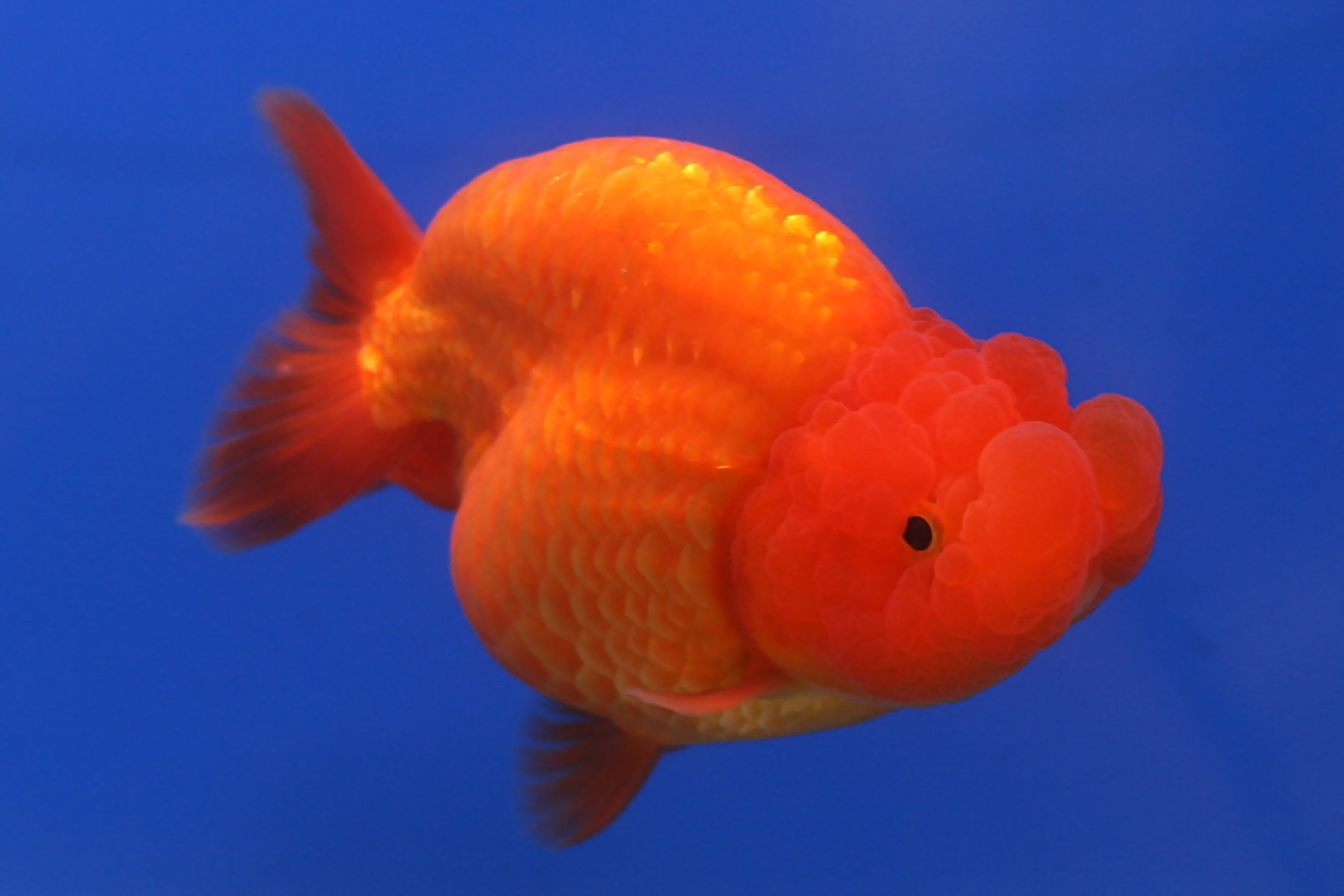

- Shukin - This goldfish was developed from Ranchus and Orandas at the end of the 19th century in Japan, and has a body shaped like long type of Ranchu, and like the Oranda, it also has a double long flowing tail fin.

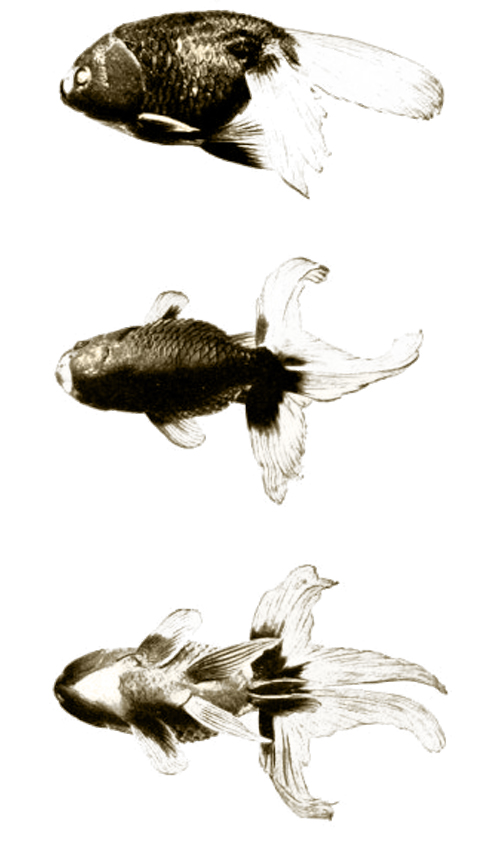

- Celestial Eye goldfish - This goldfish has double tails and a breed-defining pair of upturned, telescope eyes with pupils gazing skyward. Many people call them "stargazers" or "sky-gazers" because their eyeballs are turned permanently upwards. Due to its upturned eyes, an aquarium with rough objects should be avoided, as that can harm or hurt their eyes or even cause blindness. It is developed from the dorsal-less telescope eye goldfish. Some celestial eye goldfish have a dorsal fin.

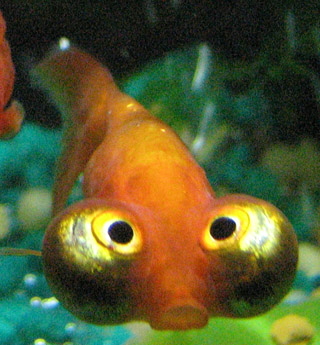

- Bubble Eye goldfish - The small, fancy bubble eye has its eyes accompanied by two large fluid-filled sacs. The sacs are fragile and easily ruptured. When their bubble-like fluid-filled sacs or bladders are ruptured, they will grow back again, but not immediately, and can also lead to infection. The ruptured sac is not the same in size as the other one and it would become asymmetrical. Due to its fluid-filled sacs, they should not be kept in an aquarium with rough objects that can rupture their sacs. Bubble eye goldfish may have a dorsal fin, but most bred bubble eyes do not. It is developed from the eggfish goldfish.

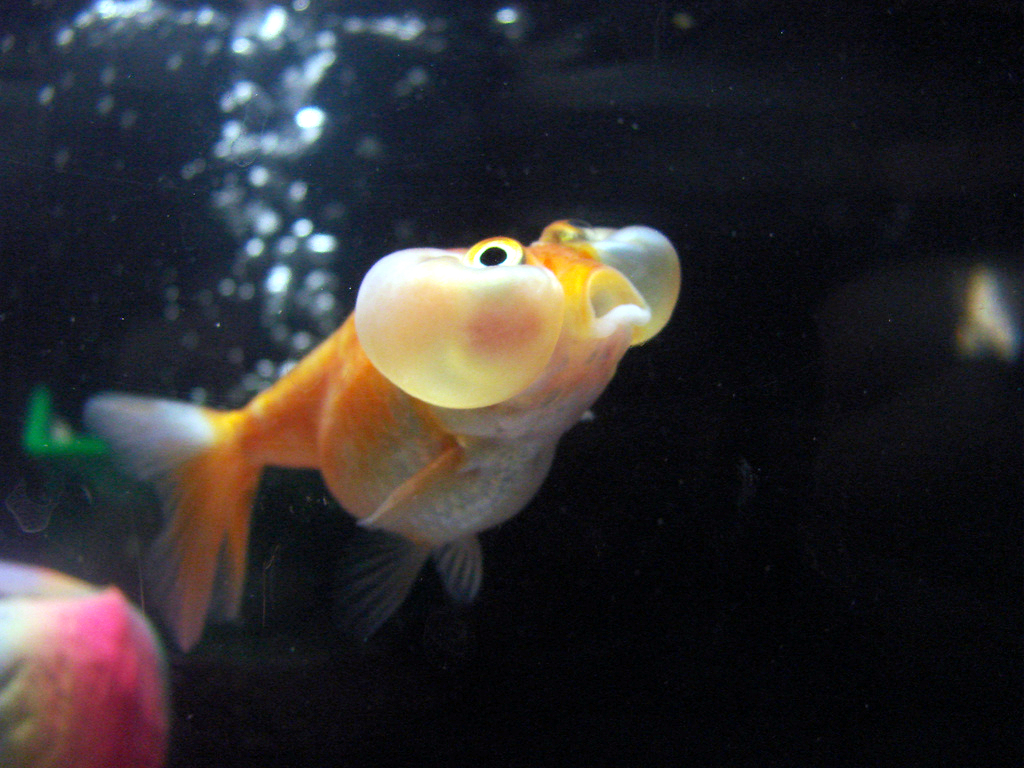

- Tricolor bubble eyed goldfish - The mutation of ryukin has led to the emergence of red bubble eyes goldfish, and the mutation of red bubble eyes goldfish led to tricolor bubble eyes goldfish. This tricolor bubble eyes goldfish was used in the development of goldfish such as eastern goldfish, vermilion goldfish, and kirico goldfish.

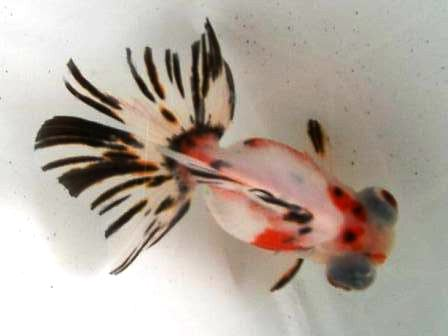

== Pond goldfish ==
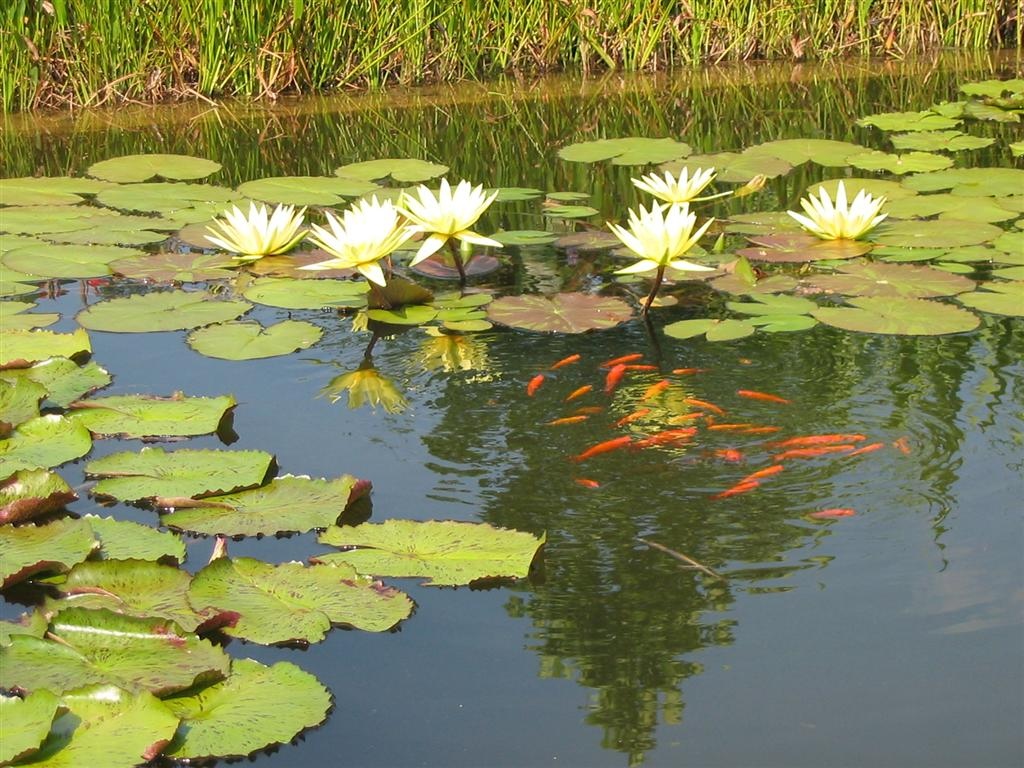
Water lilies and goldfish at Biltmore

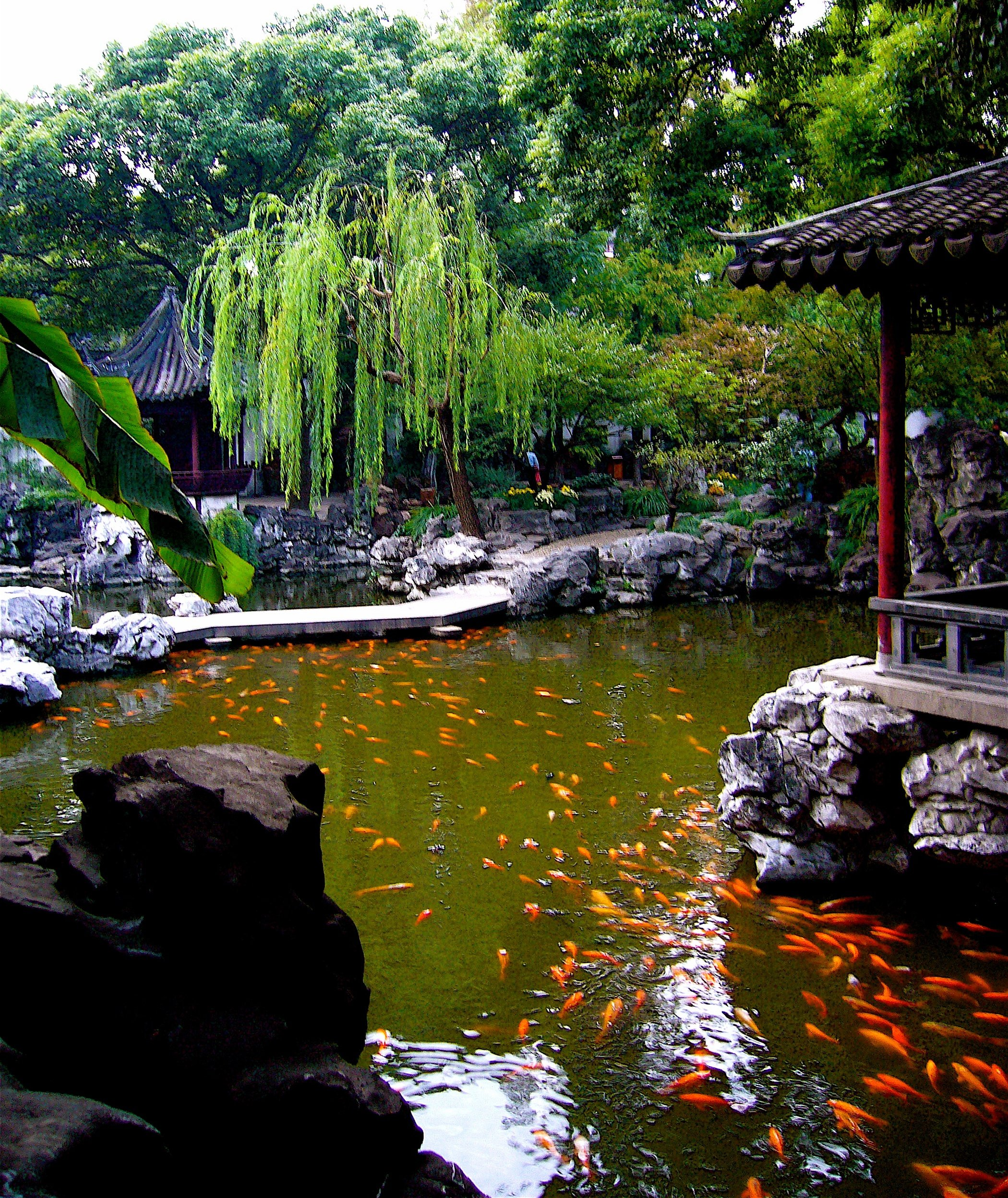
Pond goldfish at the Yuyuan Garden

Most goldfish varieties are capable of living in outdoor ponds. Goldfish that cannot live in ponds include telescopes, celestial eyes and bubble eyes, because of their fragile eyes.

== Goldfish tail types ==
Single tail types

- Wild - It is the standard single tail of any goldfish. It is like a fantail, but it is not doubled, and it is like a comet-tail, but it is not deeply forked.
- Comet-tailed - It is much longer and more deeply forked than the wild-tailed. It is like a ribbontail but it is not doubled.
- Heart-shaped-tailed - It is a single heart-shaped tail. The Bristol shubunkin is the only wild fish to have a heart-shaped tail.

Double tail types

- Fantailed - This is the standard tail type of fancy goldfish. It is a tail of the common goldfish that is doubled. It is also called a comet-tail, but with fairly shorter tail length and less sharp forks than a true comet-tail. Ryukins, orandas, fantails, and pearlscale goldfish inhabit the fantail-type fins.
- Veiltailed - It is claimed to be the standard for telescopes and orandas, but this is disputed. It is two times longer than the fantail.
- Ribbontailed - It is a longer tail and longer fork than the fantail. It is a tail of the comet-tailed goldfish that is doubled. It is like a veiltail with deeper forks.

Other tail identification

- Broadtailed - It is any finnage type of fancy goldfish that has a broad finnage and lacks the forks on the edge of the tail.
- Butterflytailed - It is any finnage type of fancy goldfish that has a butterfly finnage or their tails are flattened horizontally. It is like a broadtail, but turned sideways.

Sometimes a fancy goldfish has an angled tail peduncle, which its type may also be included.

== Colors of goldfish ==
There are three main color pigments of goldfish, but some reflect a color other than these three color pigments.

- Erythrophores have a red pigment, resulting in red goldfish.
- Xanthophores have a yellow pigment, resulting in yellow goldfish.
- Melanophores have a black pigment, resulting in black goldfish.

These are the color combinations and appearance of the three main color pigments above.

- Red - in red goldfish, many erythrophores are present, while xanthophores and melanophores are absent. Brightly colored red goldfish are often higher priced than orange ones.
- Orange - in orange goldfish, a balanced number (not exactly the same number, but nearly) of erythrophores and xanthophores are present, while melanophores are absent. This is the most common color of goldfish.
- Yellow - in yellow goldfish, many xanthophores are present, while erythrophores and melanophores are absent.
- Black - in black goldfish, many melanophores are present, while erythrophores and xanthophores are absent.
- Gray - in gray goldfish, the top of the goldfish has some melanophores, but the number of melanophores decreases as it goes down.
- White - in white goldfish, there are no pigments present.
- Brown - in brown goldfish, all three pigments are present and in balance.
- "Blue" - in "blue" goldfish, melanophores are located deep within the skin, while erythrophores and xanthophores are absent.
- Uncoloured - fry start as dull, greyish brown or olive brown fish and generally start to change colour as they mature due to genetics. The name was coined because the color is exactly the same as wild Prussian and Crucian carp. Uncommonly, the wild color on goldfish can last longer through maturity depending on the individual fish.

== See also ==
- Aquaculture
