= Maruko =

Maruko may refer to:

- The nickname of the titular character from Chibi Maruko-chan.
- The Egg-fish goldfish or in older sources, the Ranchu variety of goldfish.
