= Butterfly tail =

Butterfly tail may refer to:

- V-tail, an arrangement of the tail on aircraft
- Butterfly tail (goldfish), a breed of goldfish

== See also ==
- Pelikan tail
