= Goldfish (disambiguation) =

Goldfish are small freshwater fish that are commonly kept in aquariums and ponds.

Goldfish may also refer to:

- Goldfish (band), an electronica and dance group from Cape Town, South Africa
- Goldfish (comics), or A.K.A. Goldfish, a 1994 American comic book series written and drawn by Brian Michael Bendis
- Goldfish (cracker), a type of snack crackers manufactured by Pepperidge Farm
- Goldfish, a Japanese film featuring Masatoshi Nagase
- Goldfish (Matisse), a 1912 painting
- Goldfish plant, two genera of flowering plants, Columnea and Nematanthus
- "Goldfish" (The Brak Show), a 2001 episode
- The Goldfish, a 1924 American silent film directed by Jerome Storm
- Samuel Goldfish, a film producer better known by the name Samuel Goldwyn

== See also ==
- List of goldfish varieties
- The Golden Fish (disambiguation)
