= Egg-fish goldfish =

Breed of goldfish

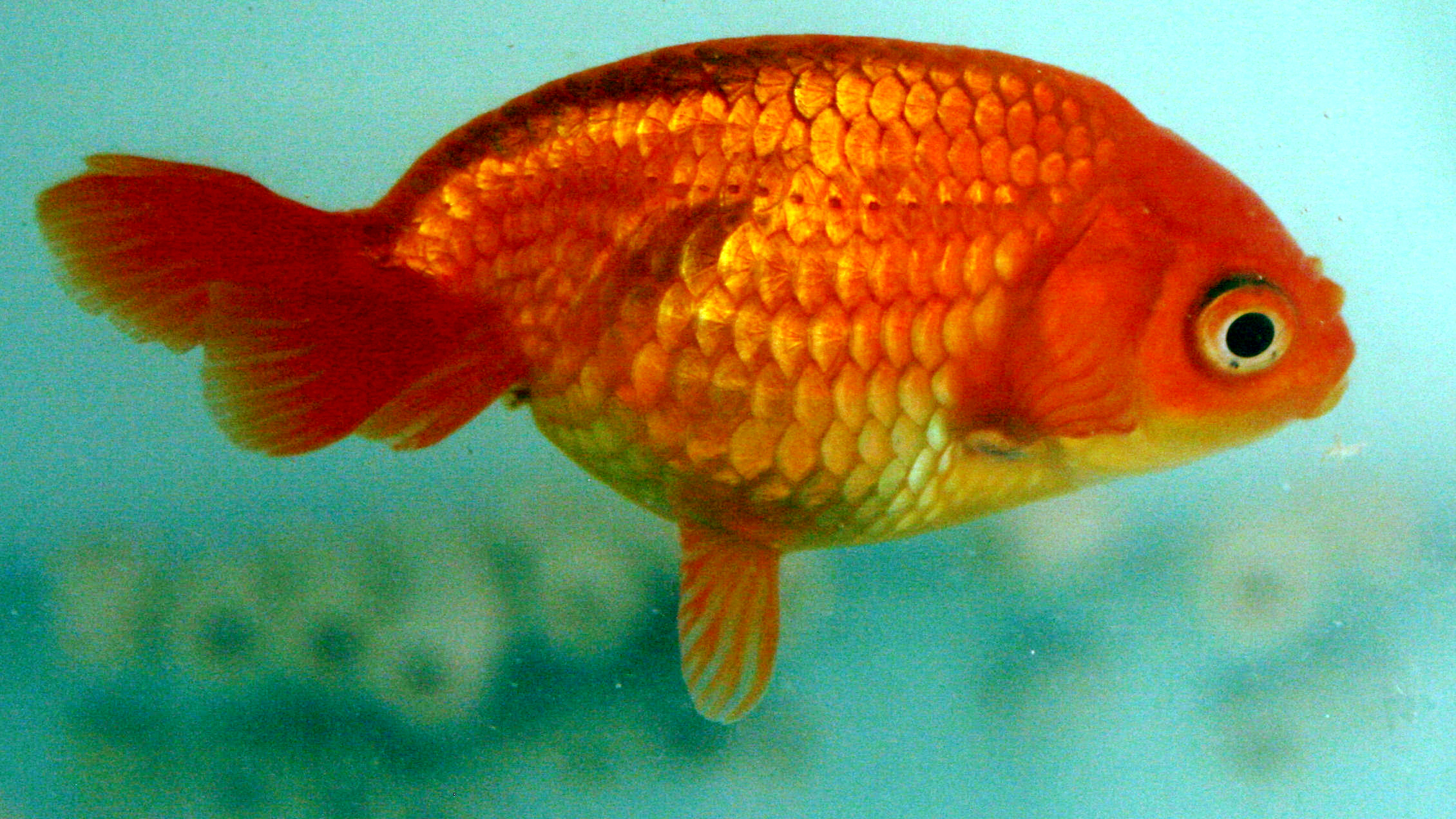
- Country of origin: China
- Type: Long-tailed and short-tailed

Classification

The egg-fish goldfish is a fancy goldfish breed which lacks a dorsal fin and has a pronounced "egg"-shaped body. The egg-fish breed resembles the ranchu, but lacks the "hood" (or wen) typical of that goldfish; ranchu also tend to have shorter, squatter bodies.

== Varieties ==
The egg-fish goldfish is commonly kept in China and is the precursor to the celestial, lionhead, pompom and the bubble-eye goldfish varieties. In Japan, the egg-fish is called maruko.

The phoenix is a Chinese goldfish variety with an egg-shaped body, a long tail, and lacking both a dorsal fin and headgrowth. It comes in all shades, colors and scale types.
