= The Golden Fish =

The Golden Fish may refer to:

- The Golden Fish (film) (1959), aka Histoire d'un poisson rouge
- Golden Fish (TV series), South Korean television
- Le Poisson d'or (1867), a ballet in 4 acts by Arthur Saint-Léon
- The Golden Fish (1925), a painting by Paul Klee
- The Golden Fish from The Gold-Children, by the Brothers Grimm
- The Golden-Headed Fish, an Armenian fairy tale
- The Old Man and the Golden Fish, a Chinese folk tale
- The wish-granting Golden Fish from The Tale of the Fisherman and the Fish a fairy tale by Alexander Pushkin
- Two Golden Fish, one of the ashtamangala, the Eight Auspicious Signs of Buddhism

== See also ==
- Goldfish
- Goldfish (disambiguation)
