= Shukin =

Breed of goldfish

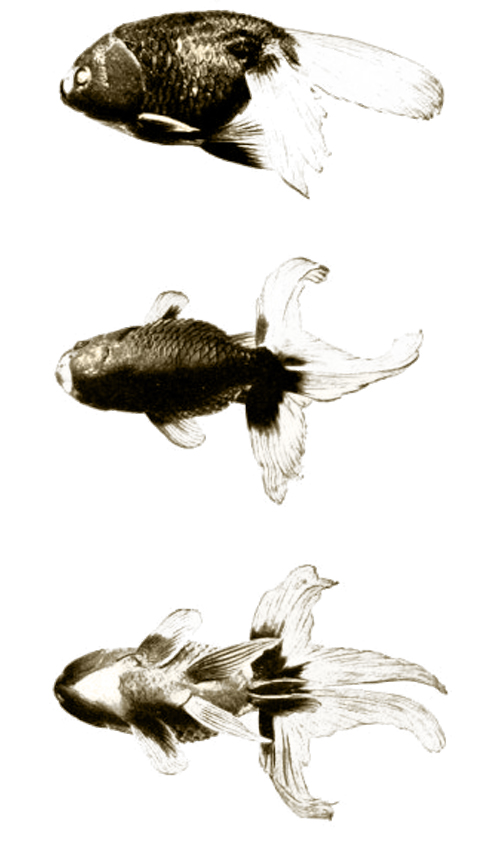
- Country of origin: Japan
- Type: Veiltailed

Classification

The Shukin (秋錦) is Ranchu-like goldfish developed from Ranchū and Oranda breeds at the end of the 19th century in Japan.

== Description ==
The Shukin has a body shaped like long type of Ranchu. But it also has a double long flowing tail fin like the Oranda.

Shukin come in red, red and white, white, blue, and silver.

== History ==
The Shukin had been developed by Akiyama Kichigoro in 1897 in Japan. It was wiped out once due to events in World War II, but has since been revived.

The Shukin is rare type of goldfish even in Japan, although the breed is becoming popular in the US with advanced hobbyists.

== See also ==
- Ranchū
- Oranda
