= Izumo Nankin =

Breed of goldfish

The Izumo Nankin (出雲南金) is a rare breed of goldfish native to southwestern Japan. It is very difficult to source individuals outside Japan, but Nankin are commonly available there. This breed has many fanciers in its native country, with many clubs dedicated to it such as the Central Nankin Lovers Association.

The nankin is a top-view fish and typically comes in a red and white coloration. The body form resembles a dorsal-less ryukin goldfish with a ranchū-like tail. The tail possess a partial fusion. When viewed from above the head, the body resembles a triangle.

== History and origins ==
The nankin originated between 1748 and 1750 in the area of modern-day Shimane Prefecture. It was developed from the Marco Goldfish, which is also an ancestor of the ranchu. It became a registered breed in Shimane Prefecture in 1982.
