= Tosakin =

Curly fantail goldfish

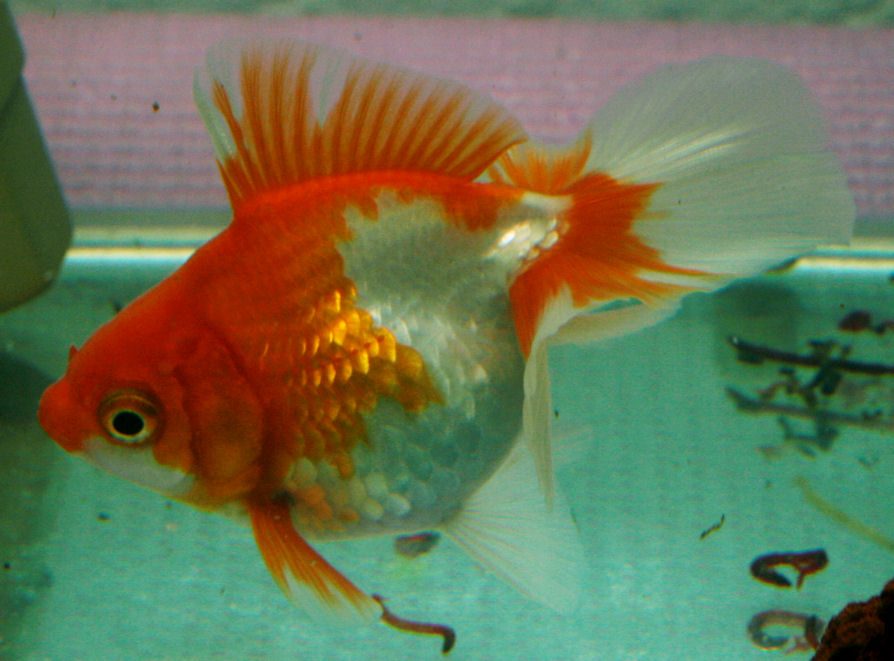
- Tosakin viewed from the side
- Country of origin: Japan
- Type: Fantailed

Classification

The Tosakin (土佐金) or curly fantail goldfish is a distinctive breed of goldfish with a large tail fin that spreads out horizontally (like a fan) behind the fish. Though technically a divided tail, the two halves are attached at the center, forming a single fin.

It was developed in Japan, and is rarely seen in other countries. It is believed to have originally been developed from the ryukins and Osaka ranchus.

== Description ==
Although it has a body shaped similar that of other fantailed goldfish, its tail fin opens and spreads flat and wide horizontally with the leading edges flipping under once or even twice. Because of its large and broad tail, the Tosakin is a weak and even clumsy swimmer, requiring it be kept in still water without a strong current. The Tosakin has been often and mistakenly reported by as a weak fish due to inbreeding, but it is as hardy as most other breeds of fancy, deep-bodied goldfish. Like many other deep-bodied goldfish, the Tosakin is especially prone to swim bladder problems.

The Tosakin is considered a "top-view" fish and is traditionally kept in large shallow bowls or small ponds to be viewed from above. Seen from above, with its pointed head and deep, round trunk, the tail is obviously a flat half circle. Tosakins are metallic red, red and white or "uncolored" iron-black. Recently calico fish with Tosakin body conformations have been developed, but many purists have yet to recognize this coloration as a true Tosakin. The Tosakin is slow growing compared to most other breeds of fancy goldfish, with a maximum attainable length of around eight inches.

== Origins ==
The Tosakin were first developed by a lower-ranking samurai in the Tosa fief (now Kōchi Prefecture), in Shikoku, Japan, and probably did not reach other parts of Japan until the mid-twentieth century.

U.S. air attacks on Kōchi during the Pacific War in 1945 and an earthquake in 1946 were believed to have wiped out the Tosakin variety. However, Mr. Hiroe Tamura (田村広衛), a Japanese hobbyist who had lost all of his fish, scoured the area and found six fish (two breeders and four two-year-olds) at a local restaurant called Kyousuirou (鏡水楼). He managed to trade a large bottle of shōchū (焼酎)(Japanese sweet-potato vodka) for the fish, and was able to successfully revive the Tosakins in Kochi. In 1969, the Japanese government declared the Tosakin a Tennen Kinenbutsu (天然記念物) or Natural Treasure of Kōchi Prefecture. In 1971 the breed had reached Tokyo, where a small group of avid young enthusiasts painstakingly propagated and popularized the variety. The Tosakin Preservation Society (トサキン保存会) was founded a few years later in Aichi prefecture (愛知県).

== Husbandry ==
The Tosakin variety requires specific care because of the particular attention placed on achieving the desired tail shape. In order to achieve its connected, fanned-out appearance, the Tosakin has traditionally been kept in shallow, round bowls that allow the tail to fully develop during the fish's first year of life. The low water level and rounded corners of the enclosure prevent excessive upward and downward movement, allowing the Tosakin's tail to form correctly and achieve the distinctive spread-out fan style. In Japan, earthenware bowls traditionally "60cm/24" wide and 18 cm/8" deep with sloping sides" are utilized to house the fish. The bowls are commonly kept outdoors and require no filter. Water quality is kept up through frequent, meticulous water changes.

Of the rare few who breed the Tosakin goldfish, many continue to use the original Japanese husbandry methods today. They utilize a wide, shallow water depth, but often opt for the addition of gentle filtration to alleviate the need for excessive water changes to maintain water quality. Sponge filters are commonly used for the Tosakin, as the water agitation is minimal compared to other filtration methods. The variety is known for being a clumsy swimmer, so excessive water movement must be prohibited to avoid unnecessary stress on the fish. Many consider the Tosakin a delicate goldfish variety, but the breed has proven hardy enough to be kept outdoors all year long like other single- and double-tail varieties.
