= Pompom (goldfish) =

Breed of goldfish

Pompom goldfish
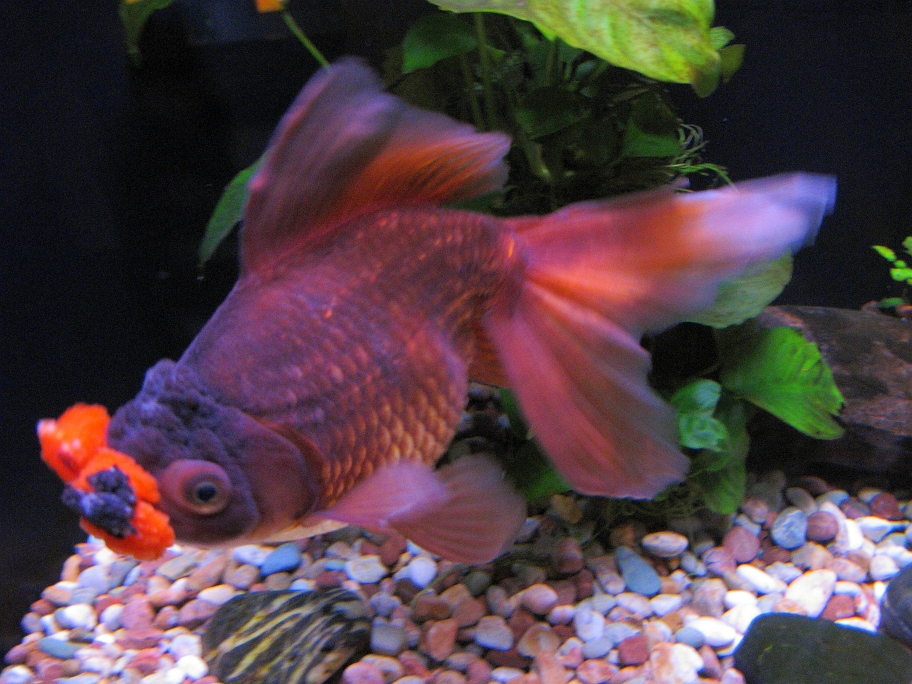
- Country of origin: China
- Type: Fantailed

Classification
- BAS

Pompom or hana fusa are a type of fancy goldfish that have bundles of loose fleshy outgrowths between the nostrils, on each side of the head.

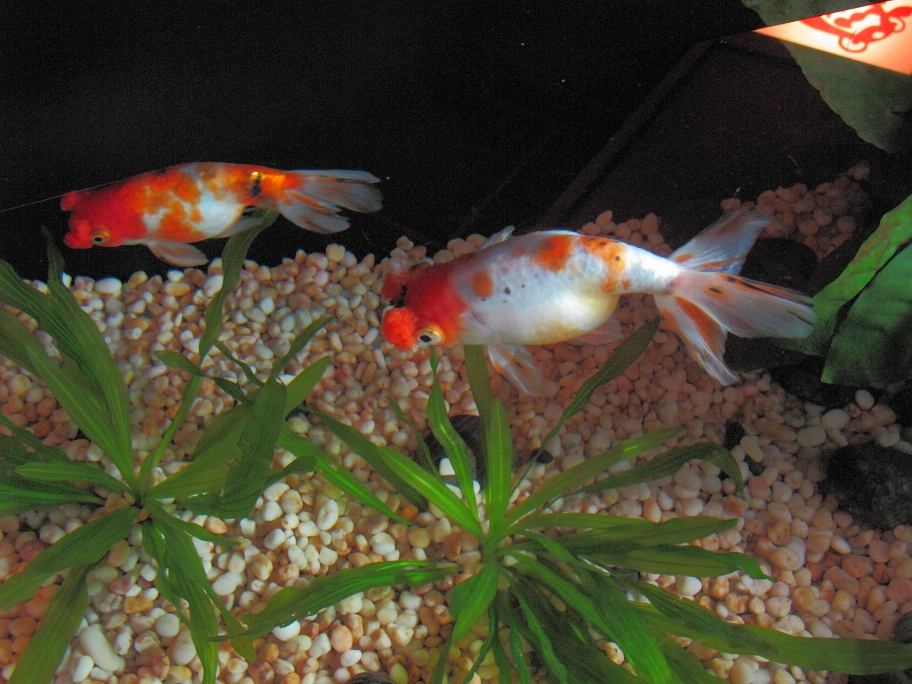
A pair of pom pom goldfish

== Description ==
The pompom has a similar body shape and finnage to the lionhead or Oranda but instead of supporting a headgrowth it has nasal outgrowths. The extent of the nasal outgrowths, which are enlargements of the nasal septum, vary in pompom goldfish. In some, the outgrowths hang down past the mouth. These skin outgrowths around the nostrils of pompoms are developed through selective breeding. Pompoms may have either metallic or nacreous scalation, and can occur with or without a dorsal fin. It will be best if the lionhead variety of these fishes are engaged with the same variety or other dorsal fin less fishes.

The Chinese submit this variety as the "Velvet ball". There are records for the existence of this fish being seen as far back as 1898. The first importation of these fish into the United Kingdom was in 1936 when the original fish were exported from Shanghai and others were displayed at an aquarium in Paris. It was quite popular in the early days of the fancy goldfish, but is now very rarely seen for sale or on display.

== Variants ==
The hana fusa or pompom oranda is an elegant pompom with a dorsal fin.
