= Curled-gill goldfish =

Breed of goldfish

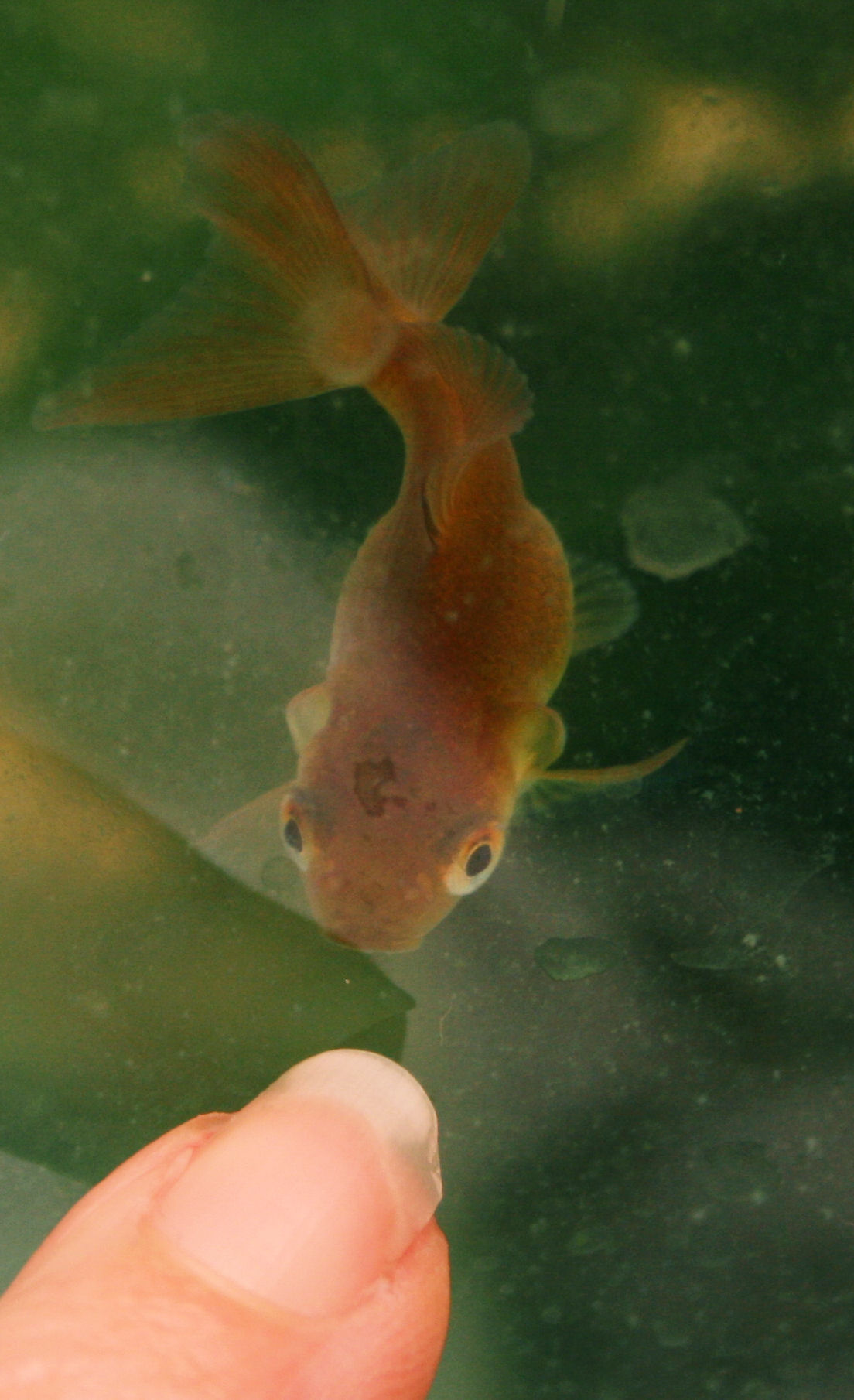
Baby bronze fantail goldfish with curled gills

The Curled-gill or Reversed-gill goldfish is another uncommon variety of fancy goldfish that has been developed by specialist enthusiasts. It owes its name from the out-turned appearance of its gill covers. This fish resembles a Ryukin. For the appearance of this goldfish, it has a fantail-shaped body with long finnage all round as well as a deeply forked tail; the color is typically metallic orange.
