= Lionchu =

Goldfish variety

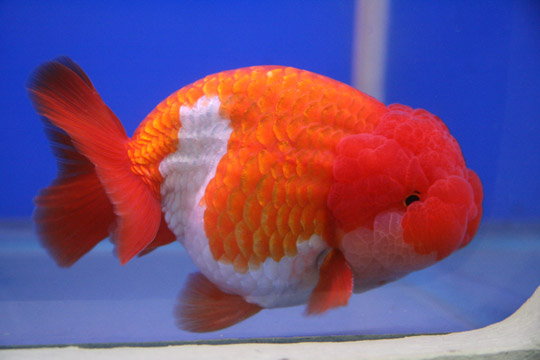
- Country of origin: Thailand
- Type: Fantailed

Classification
- AGA

The Lionchu or lionhead-ranchu (Thai: สิงห์ลูกผสม) is a variety of goldfish that has resulted from crossbreeding lionheads and ranchus.

== Description ==
The Western criteria for lionchus combine the traditional characteristic side-view profiles of the ranchu and the lionhead. The ranchu's deep body, broad and curved back, and tail placement has been merged with the large headgrowth of the lionhead. Lionchus do not have dorsal fins, a trait inherited from both parent breeds.

== Origins and evolution ==
Although at first, the lionchus were considered merely as mongrels, being hybrids of the lionheads and ranchus, the lionhead actually have an ancestor from Japan in the 1800s; it is then known as the shishigashira ranchu or lion-headed ranchu. The shishigashira ranchu is a ranchu-like goldfish with small amounts of headgrowth and some having small knobs and bumps on the back (a suggestion that the absence of the dorsal fin had not yet been stabilized at the time). The modern-day lionchu is considered to have originated from Thailand, and was popularized by a group of goldfish hobbyists in Singapore through RafflesGold.com, an internet-based goldfish forum site. The lionchu was officially recognized as a unique class of fancy goldfish during the "My Fancy Goldfish Competition 2006", which was held in Singapore from May 26–28, 2006.

== See also ==
- Oranda
