= Butterfly telescope goldfish =

Breed of goldfish

Butterfly telescope goldfish
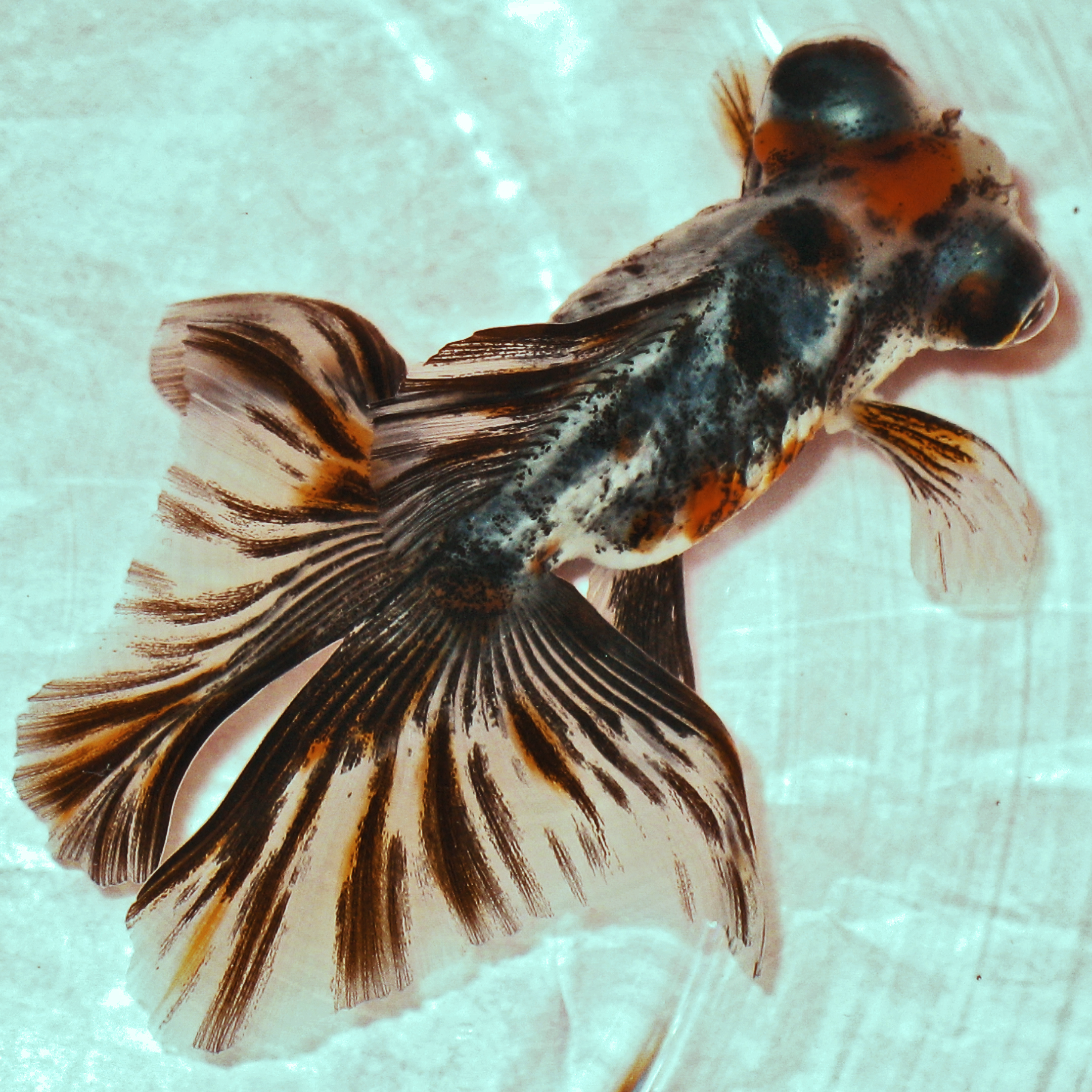
Country of origin
China
Type
Goldfish

The Butterfly telescope goldfish (Teichfischer, 1994) is a variant of telescope goldfish that is distinguished by the butterfly-shaped caudal fins when viewed from above. It is a variety that has only recently been deemed a major lineage by a few published works. The tail conformation is commonly bred into the telescope eye goldfish, the term "butterfly tail" is just short for the many names this variety has such as Butterfly Tail Demekin, Butterfly Tail Black Moor and Top view Telescope (TVT), and many other goldfish varieties.

== Description and production ==
The butterfly telescope goldfish is a variant form of the telescope goldfish with protruding eyes and is best appreciated by viewing it from above. While this tail variation is commonly paired with the telescope eye variation, 'butterfly shaped tails' may be present in other goldfish standard varieties such as ryukins or orandas. The tail spread is preferable 180 degrees but some may droop down at an angle due to the weight of the long tail fins. With the rise in popularity of butterfly tail moors, there have been efforts to distinguish the different butterfly tail types such as the faery butterfly, shuan shu (Chinese comb tail) butterfly, delta and trapezium tail butterfly.

== See also ==
- List of unusual biological names
