= Lionhead (goldfish) =

Fancy goldfish

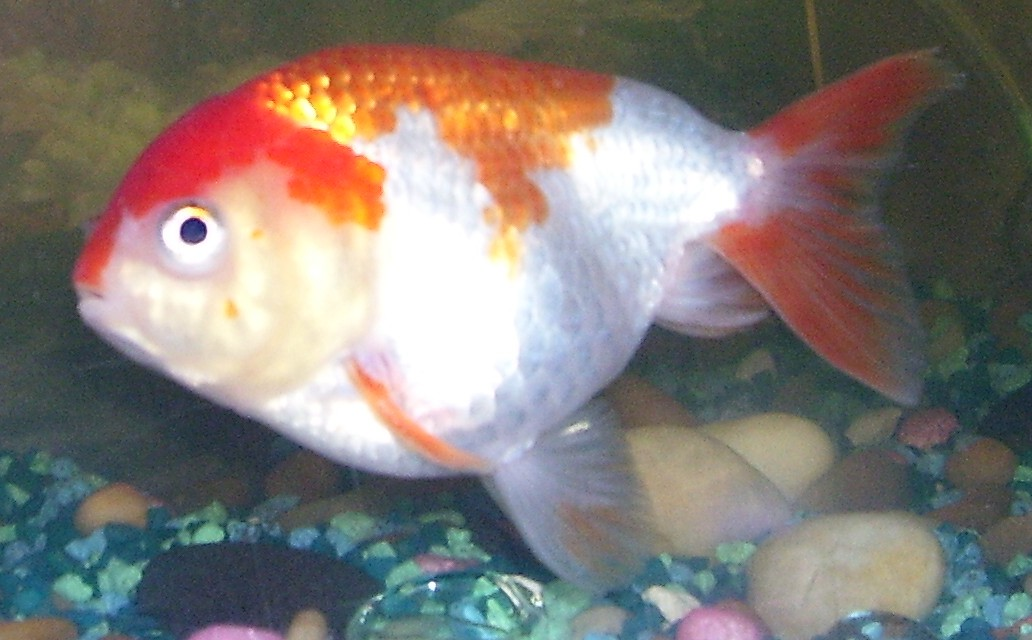
- Country of origin: China
- Type: Fantailed

Classification
- BAS

The lionhead is a hooded variety of fancy goldfish. This fish is the precursor to the ranchu.

== Description ==
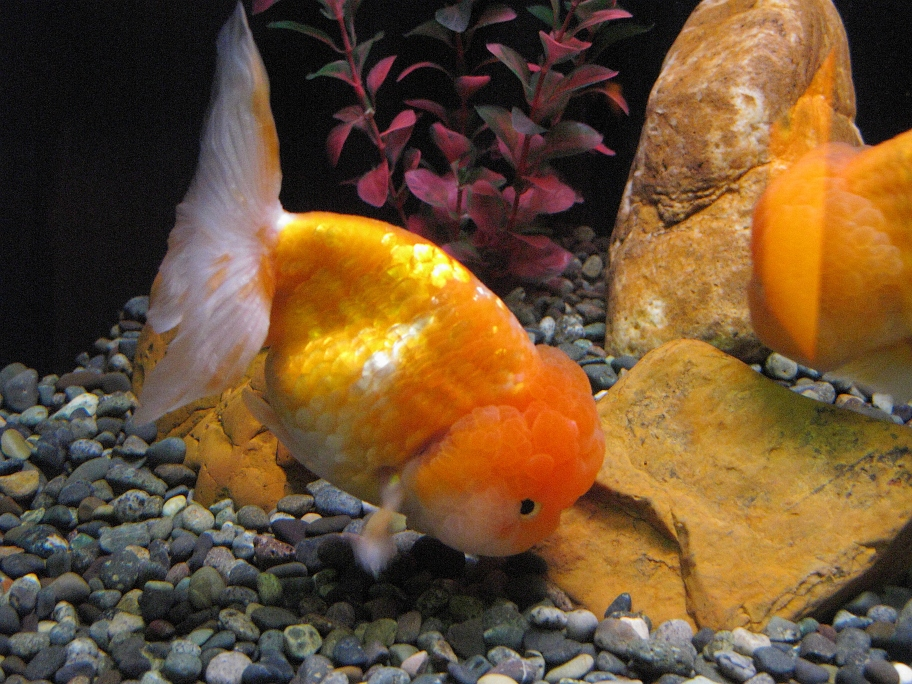
Gold red and white Lionhead goldfish

The tremendous hood or headgrowth and fat cheeks of lionheads give them a facial appearance similar to canine puppies. The "wen" (Chinese term for headgrowth) fully covers the head, cheeks and gill plates of the fish. Furthermore, lionheads have short but deep bodies, and relatively straight or evenly arched backs without dorsal fins. The finnage, in general, is short. Breeding standards require that the lionhead's anal fins are paired, the double tail fin should not droop, and its upper edges should be held away from the body. The tail of a traditional lionhead can be fully separated, partially separated, or webbed. The tail should also meet the caudal peduncle (the area where the body joins the tail) in a fashion that is almost perpendicular to the body. The caudal peduncle is ideally broad, allowing the tail to open when the fish swims. The back of the proper lionhead is quite broad to support the placement of the raspberry-like hood. Hood development may vary but is more pronounced in males. The hood normally takes a year to develop in young fry. Mature male lionheads periodically shed patches of their headgrowths.

Lionheads can grow up to 6 inches (15 cm) in length (including finnage) and may have metallic, nacreous or matte scales. They are available in orange, red, white, red-and-white, blue, black, black-and-white, black-and-red, natural, and chocolate colorations.

Lionheads can also be crossbred with Ranchus to create Lionchu offspring.

== Origins ==
A painting of Chinese/Japanese lion-dogs. Lionhead goldfish were bred to mimick the appearance of this mythological Asian animal.

Lionheads were bred in China to depict the image of the mythical Chinese lion-dog (the shishi, in Japanese legend). They were introduced to Japan from China during the 17th and 18th centuries. The Japanese produced lionheads with more rounded back profiles, modified tails and diminished size of the headgrowth.

== See also ==
- Oranda
