= Ranchu =

Fancy goldfish

Ranchū
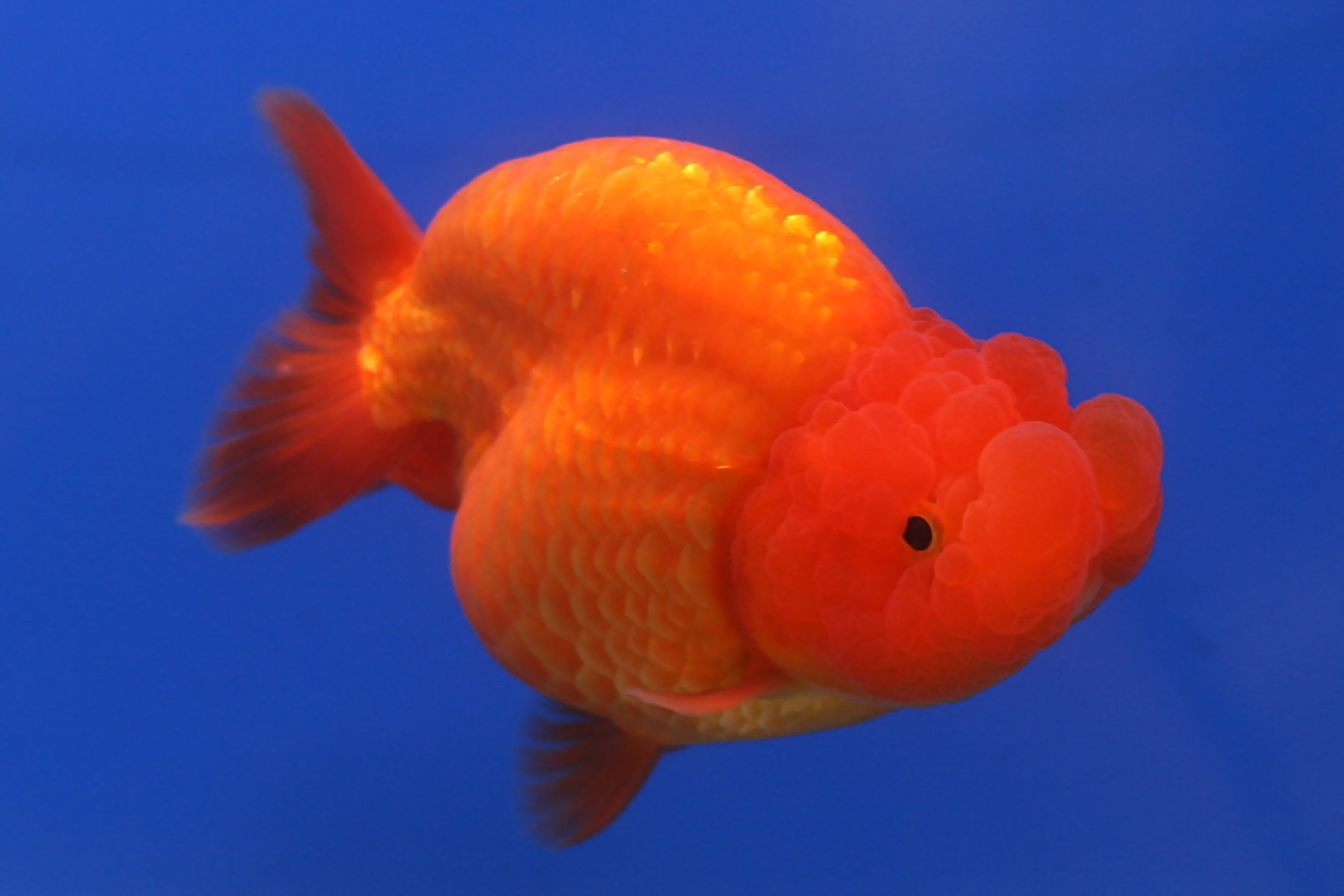
- Country of origin: Japan
- Type: Fantailed

Classification
- BAS

The Ranchū (蘭鋳, 蘭虫, 卵虫; "Dutch worm"), also Maruko, is a hooded variety of goldfish native to Japan, which lacks a dorsal fin. It is referred to as the "king of goldfish" by the Japanese. Maruko more commonly refers to the egg-fish goldfish.

== Breed origin ==
The ranchū is a member of the Japanese development of the lionhead. They are the direct outcome of crossbreeding experiments with Chinese lionhead specimens.

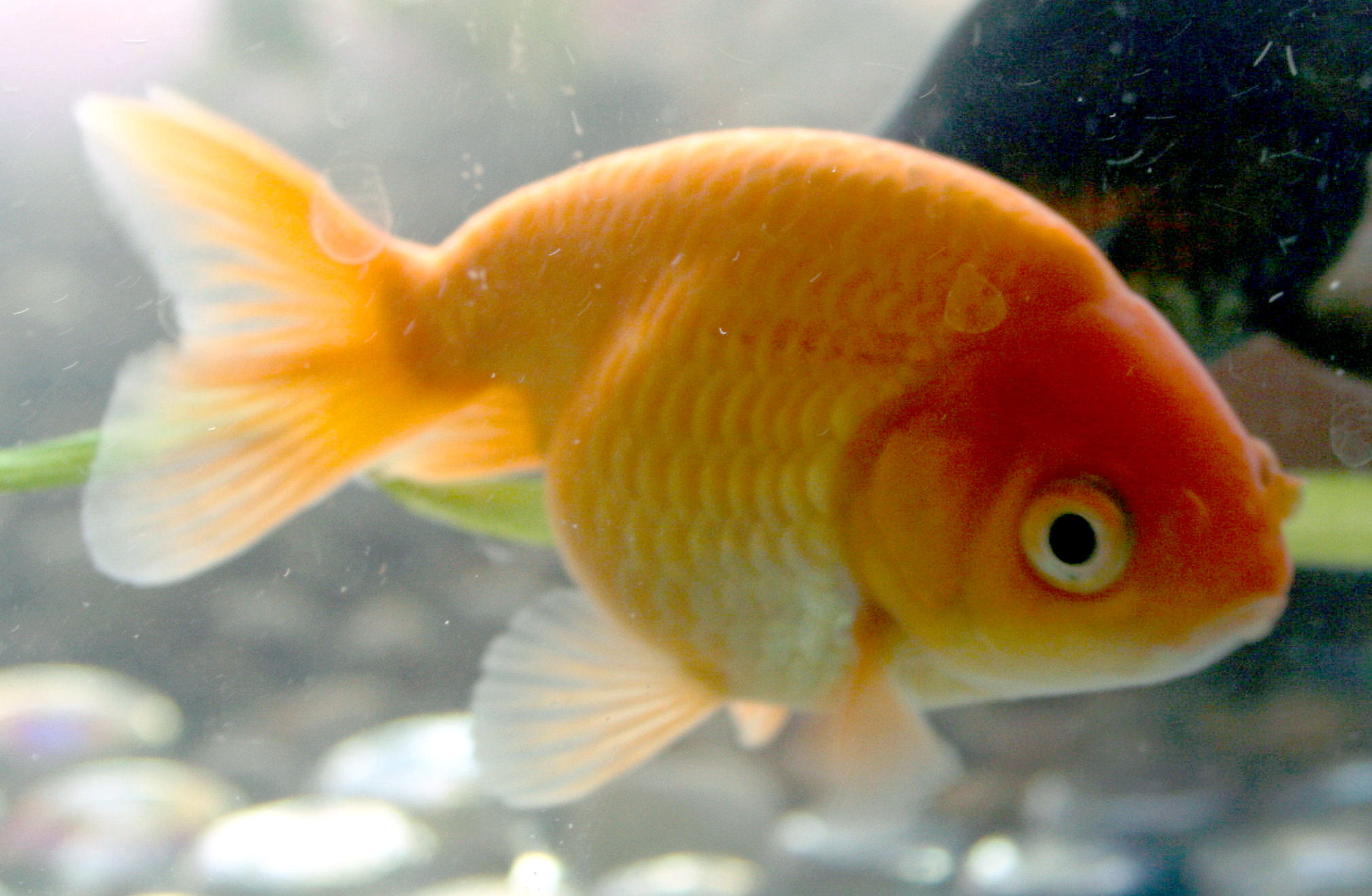
Orange ranchū

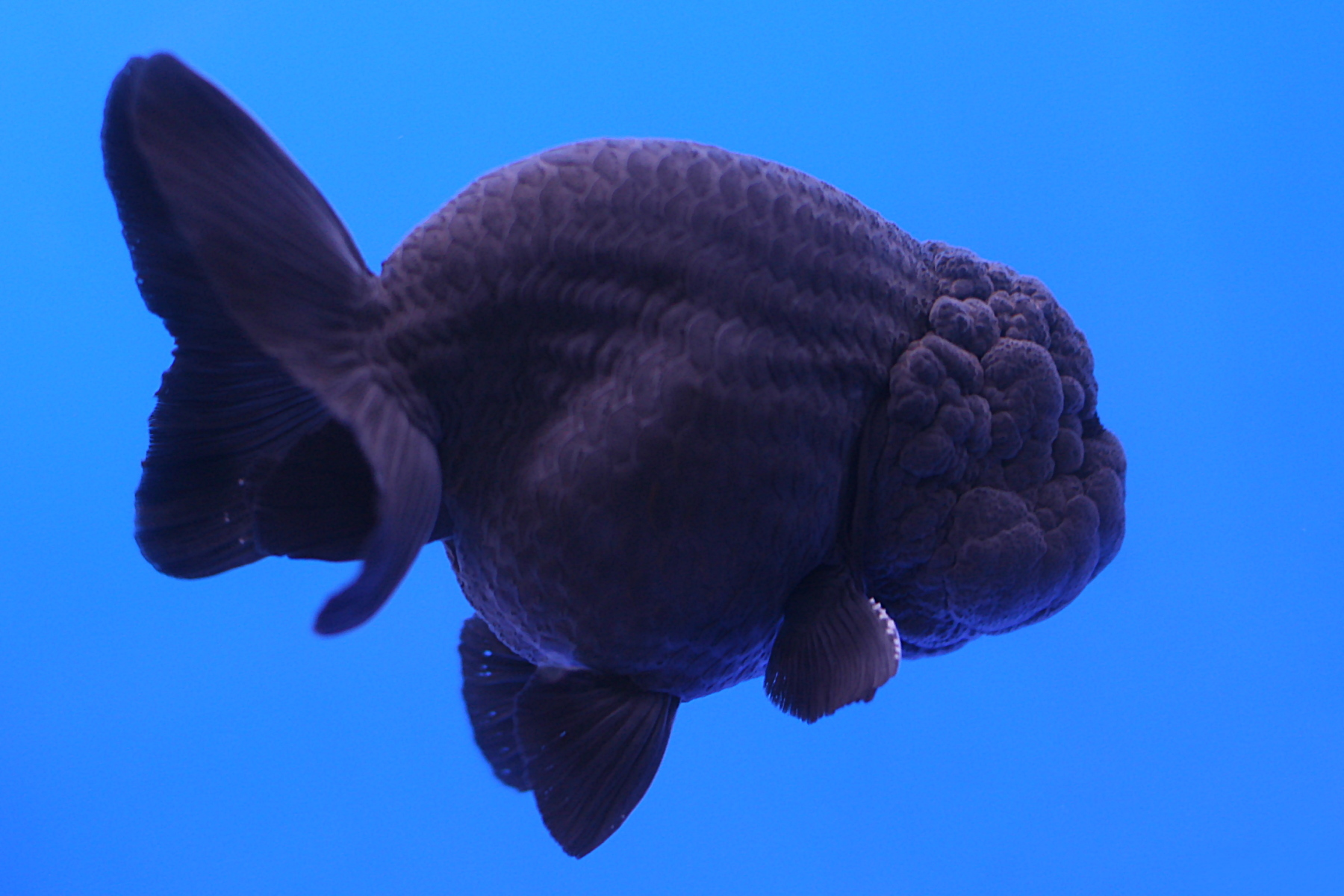
Black ranchū

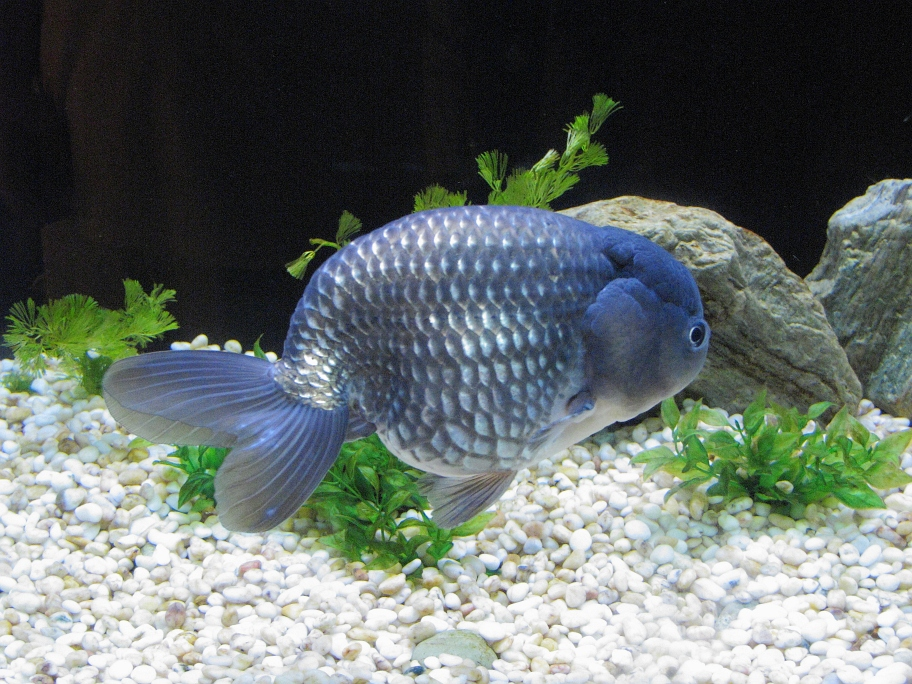
Blue ranchū

== Morphology ==
Ranchū have egg-shaped bodies and deep bellies – between 5/8 to 3/4 the length of the fish. These goldfish have no dorsal fin. Breeding standards require that the back should not have any vestiges of the dorsal fin on it. The back should be rounded, not flat like a lionhead. The area of the caudal peduncle should curve sharply downwards to meet the tail. The caudal peduncle itself is broad. A properly formed caudal peduncle avoids swimming motion impairments. The ranchū tail meets the caudal peduncle at a 45-degree angle, giving the fish a unique swimming motion. The tail lobes are rounded, and all other fins are paired.

Compared to lionheads, ranchū have a particularly down-turned tail and tail fin. Ranchū have arched backs and much shorter tails, which are tucked in at a 45-degree angle.

Ranchū's most prominent feature are their heads. Sufficient space between the eyes, and also from the eyes to the front of the head must be preserved. The gill cover should extend towards the tail. The head growth should seem to begin from the bottom of the gill cover and move upward. The head growths (wen) of ranchū fry may take at least a year to develop. Fry possessing broad foreheads and square noses generally produce better wens. Mature ranchū can reach between 6 and 8 inches (15 to 20 centimeters) in length.

They may come in orange, red, white, grey and brown, as well as combinations of these colors. Scalation may either be metallic, nacreous (calico) or matte. Ranchū with pale-yellow bodies and bright red heads are rare.

They are well-adapted to fluctuations in pH levels and water quality.

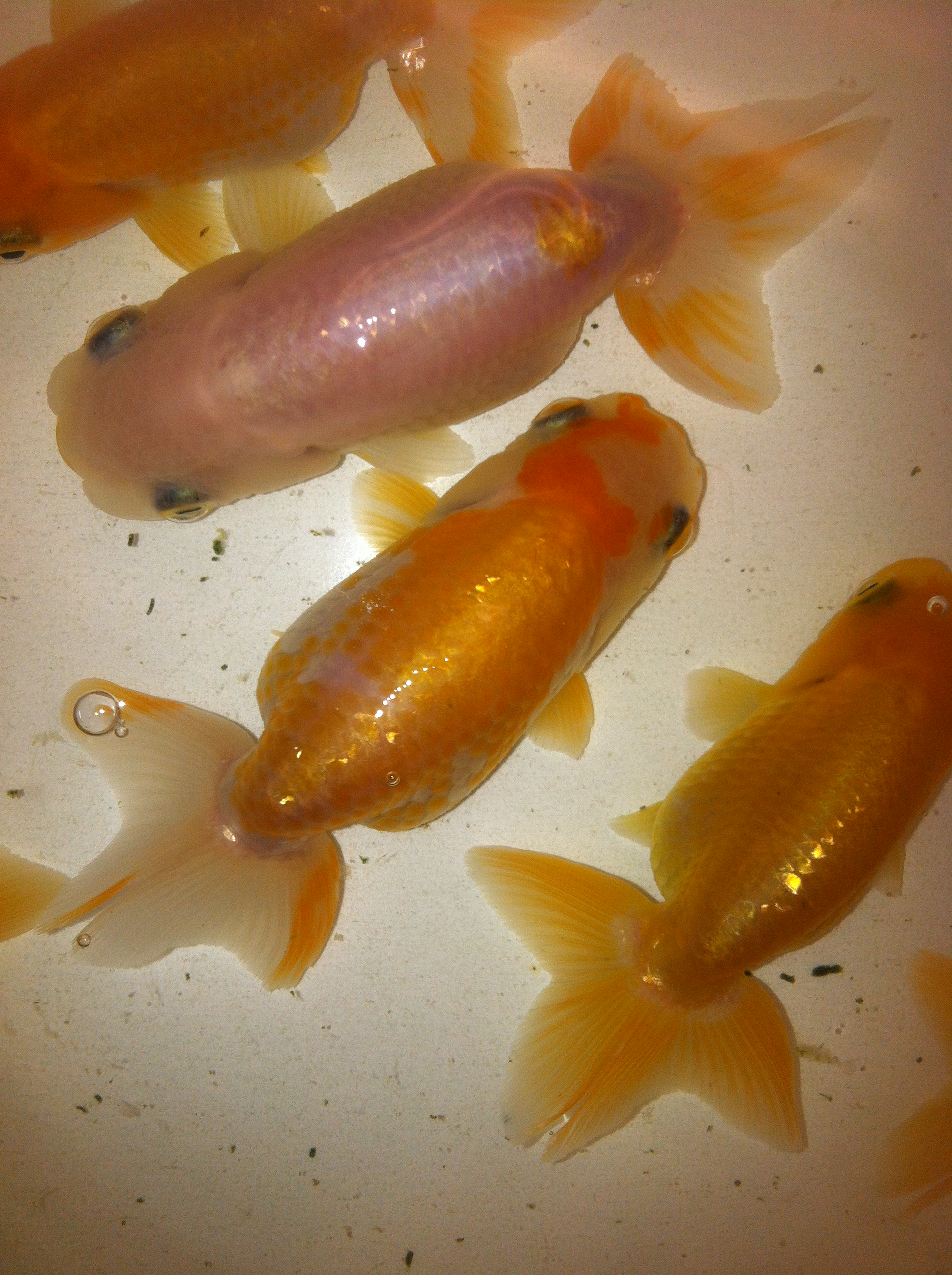
Top-view ranchū from the US

== Classification, deportment and conformation ==
Japanese, Thai, American, and British ranchu breeders, as well as many goldfish societies, adhere to two strict viewing classifications, namely the top-view ranchū comportment and the side-view selection criteria. Japanese aesthetic standards for ranchū are more exacting. Ranchū are often compared to sumo wrestlers, as the ranchū is a rounded fish with a head-growth (known as a "bramble-head"). However, traditional Japanese culture, aesthetics, and concepts regard these attributes of both ranchū and sumo wrestlers as an imposing and solid figure composed of massive circles and squares, which are abstract representations of balance, proportion, dignity, graceful movement and power.

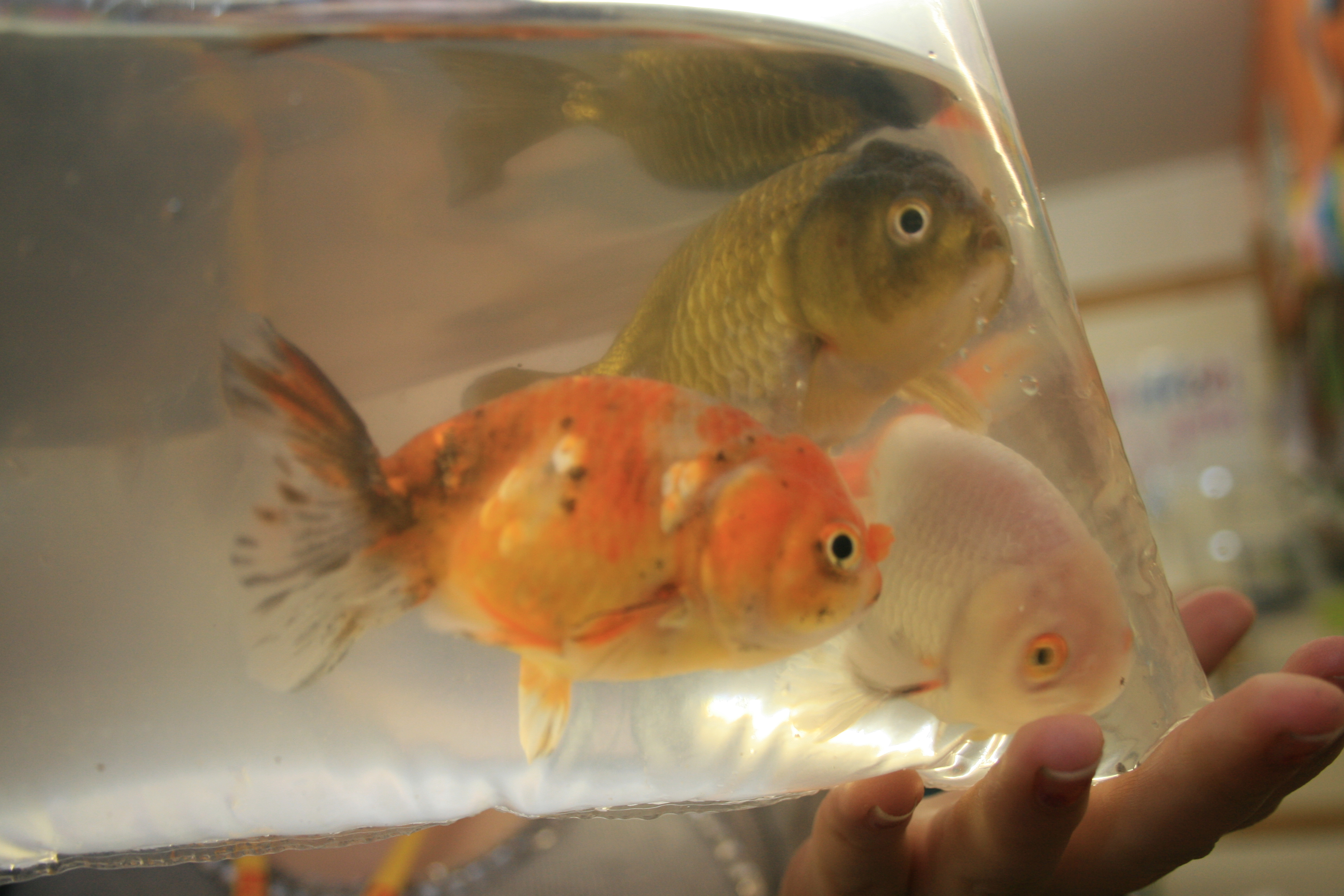
Three ranchū in a bag of water in a retail shop in Manchester, England

=== Top-view ranchū (TVR) ===
In ancient China, goldfish were kept in large jars made of pottery or porcelain, so the only way one could see the fish was from the top. For this reason, generations of people selected goldfish with big bellies, big wens, and dragon eyes genes. Therefore, the top view ranchū is considered better aesthetically in Japan and China. The TVR should have a rectangle shape, a short tail, and big wen on the head. When swimming, their appearance should resemble a worm moving in water, which gives the ranchū its name (in Chinese, "luan chong" means "egg shape worm").

=== Side-view ranchū (SVR) ===
A ranchū's back (seen from the side) is comparable to a traditional Japanese comb, which comes in two shapes. The negate or long style is long with rounded corners and is similar to the koban coin. The mature or the round style is shorter and is similar to a round coin viewed from the side, but still not as round as any circular coin. Both comb shapes are acceptable in ranchū exhibitions and competitions.

=== Selection and judging ===
Most goldfish shows and competitions judge ranchū in an aquarium setting. Judges view the fish from the side and the top, taking note of its comportment and conformation to physical standards, motion, and movements. The attachment of the tail to the caudal peduncle is also evaluated. True Japanese ranchū are judged from above in shallow bowls but not glass tanks. Although the overall shape of the ranchū is taken into account it is the top view that is the most important. Western goldfish societies tend to use glass tanks for judging, but a number of societies based on Japanese methods are now operational and follow the traditional way the ranchū are bred, kept, and judged. True Japanese ranchū enthusiasts keep their ranchū in shallow ponds or vats.

== Clinical and pathological effects ==
Goldfish (Carassius auratus auratus) are a domesticated variety of the Chinese Crucian carp "Gibelio" (Carassius auratus gibelio), a common Chinese carp. Perhaps 700 years ago, egg goldfish were first bred for their lack of a dorsal fin. Prior to the 17th century, lionhead goldfish with this trait were kept in China and Japan, and the ranchū breed was derived from them. A dorsal fin is found on all normal fish. This fin keeps the fish stable in the water and keeps them from rolling. Swimming speed, acceleration, and efficiency are all slower in goldfish missing dorsal fins than in normal goldfish. They must also deal with a tendency to roll to the side while moving or at rest, as well as a lack of directional stability. Ranchu goldfish are also susceptible to dropsy, bladder issues and too large wen growth that can cover gills and eyes due to selective breeding and inbreeding.

== See also ==
- Goldfish
  - Lionhead
  - Lionchu
  - Oranda
