= Blackmore (name) =

Blackmore (variations include: Blackmoore, Blackmoor, Blackmor) is a surname. Notable people with the surname include:

- Anauta Blackmore (c. 1890–1965), Inuit lecturer and writer
- Amy Blackmore, Canadian impresario
- Ben Blackmore (born 1993), English rugby league player
- Beulah Blackmore (1886–1967), American home economist
- Bill Blackmore, English footballer, active 1912–1920
- Clayton Blackmore (born 1964), Welsh international footballer
- Clifford Blackmore, Kansas politician
- Darren Blackmore, better known as Daz Black (born 1985), English YouTuber
- David Blackmore (cricketer) (1909–1988), Welsh cricketer
- Denis Blackmore (1943–2022), American mathematician
- Edwin Gordon Blackmore (1837–1909), South Australian parliamentary secretary and horseman
- Eleanor Blackmore (1873–1943), English Baptist missionary in Nicaragua
- Elizabeth Blackmore (born 1987), Australian actress
- Emilie Blackmore Stapp (1876–1962), American children's author and philanthropist
- Ernest Blackmore (1895–1955), English cricketer
- Frank Blackmore (1916–2008), British airman and traffic engineer
- George Blackmore (1908–1984), English cricketer
- George Blackmore Guild (1834–1917), American politician
- Ginny Blackmore (born 1986), New Zealand singer-songwriter
- Harold Blackmore (1904–1989), English footballer
- Hedley Blackmore (1901–1992), Australian rules footballer
- Hugh Enes Blackmore (1863–1945), British opera and concert singer
- Jake Blackmore (died 1964), Welsh rugby union player
- James Blackmore (1821–1875), American politician
- John Blackmore (fl. 1634–1657), English politician
- John Horne Blackmore (1890–1971), Canadian politician
- Jürgen Blackmore, British guitarist, son of Ritchie Blackmore
- Leigh Blackmore (born 1959), Australian horror writer and critic
- Lewis Blackmore (1886–1916), Australian rules footballer
- Mahia Blackmore (1949–2021), New Zealand singer and band leader
- Neil Blackmore, British novelist
- Peter Blackmore (footballer) (1879–1937), English footballer
- Peter Blackmore (politician) (born 1945), Australian politician and mayor of Maitland
- R. D. Blackmore (1825–1900), English novelist
- Rachael Blackmore (born 1989), Irish jockey
- Richard Blackmore (1654–1729), English poet and physician
- Richard Blackmore (American football) (born 1956), American football player
- Richie Blackmore (rugby league) (born 1969), New Zealand footballer and coach
- Ritchie Blackmore (born 1945), British rock guitarist
- Rod Blackmore (born 1935), Australian magistrate
- Roger Blackmore (1941–2024), English politician
- Selwyn Blackmore (born 1972), New Zealand cricketer
- Sophia Blackmore (1857–1945), Australian missionary
- Stephen Blackmore (born 1952), British botanist
- Steve Blackmore (born 1962), Welsh rugby union player
- Susan Blackmore (born 1951), British parapsychologist, writer, and lecturer
- Thomas Blackmore (fl. 1659–1652), English politician
- William Blackmore (minister) (died 1684), English ejected minister
- William Henry Blackmore (1827–1878), English lawyer
- Winston Blackmore, Canadian leader of a polygamous Mormon fundamentalist group

== See also ==
- Lennox Blackmoore (born 1950), Guyanese boxer
- R. P. Blackmur (1904–1965), American literary critic
- Blackmore (disambiguation) (includes titles with "Blackmoor")
- Blackmore, a town in Essex, England
