= Blakemore (surname) =

Blakemore is an English surname. Notable people with the surname include:

- A. K. Blakemore (born 1991), English author, poet and translator
- Amy Blakemore (born 1958), American photographer
- Cecil Blakemore (1897–1963), English footballer
- Chris Blakemore (1944–2022), Australian basketball player
- Colin Blakemore (1944–2022), British neurobiologist specializing in vision
- Dominic Blakemore (born 1969), British businessman
- Frances Blakemore (1906–1997), American-Japanese artist
- Ian Blakemore (born 1965), English cricketer
- John Blakemore (1936–2025), English photographer
- Karin J. Blakemore (born 1953), American medical geneticist
- Michael Blakemore (1928–2023), Australian actor, writer and theatre director
- Reg Blakemore (1924–2006), Welsh rugby union and rugby league player
- Richard Blakemore (1775–1855), English ironmaster and politician
- Sally Blakemore (born 1947), American paper engineer and pop-up book packager
- Sarah-Jayne Blakemore (born 1974), English professor and psychologist
- Sean Blakemore (born 1967), American actor
- Stella Blakemore (1906–1991), South African author
- Thomas Blakemore (1915–1994), American-Japanese lawyer and philanthropist
- Trevor Blakemore (1879–1953), English poet and author
- William Henry James Blakemore (1871–1945), English engraver and medallist
