= Blakemore =

Blakemore may refer to:

- Blakemore (surname), with a list of people by this name
- Blakemore, Arkansas, United States
- A. F. Blakemore, British food retail, wholesale and distribution company usually known as Blakemore
- G. Blakemore Evans (1912–2005), American scholar of Elizabethan literature
- Sengstaken–Blakemore tube, used in the management of upper gastrointestinal hemorrhage
- Steuart Blakemore Building, museum and historical archive, part of the Mary Ball Washington Museum and Library in Lancaster, Virginia

== See also ==
- Blackmore (disambiguation)
- Blackamoors (disambiguation)
