= Tadashi Nakayama =

Tadashi Nakayama may refer to:

- Tadashi Nakayama (artist), 1927–2014
- Tadashi Nakayama (mathematician), 1912–1964
