= Peter Blackmore =

Peter Blackmore may refer to:

- Peter Blackmore (politician) (born 1945), Australian politician and mayor
- Peter Blackmore (footballer) (1879–1937), English footballer
- Peter Blackmore (screenwriter) (1909–1984), British screenwriter of Miranda, Mrs. Gibbons' Boys, Mad About Men, and Time Gentlemen, Please! amongst others
