= Oranda =

Breed of goldfish

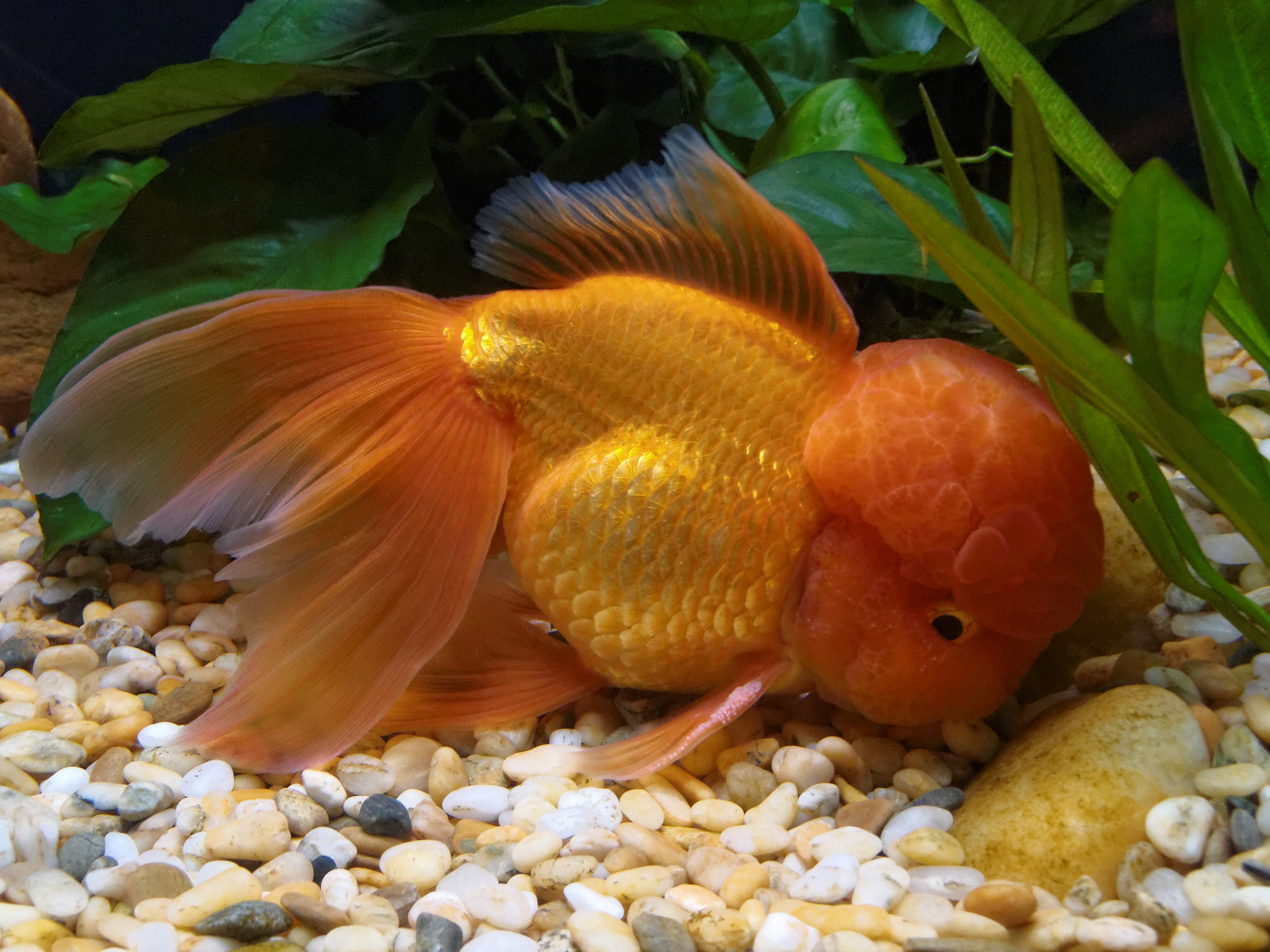
- Country of origin: China
- Type: Veiltailed

Classification
- BAS

The oranda is a breed of goldfish characterized by a prominent bubble-like "hood" on the head. The headgrowth or hood (also known as a "wen" or "crown") may be a prominent growth or may encase the entire face except the mouth.

The name comes from the Japanese Oranda-shishi-gashira, meaning "Dutch lionhead". The breed is in fact of Chinese origin, but it may have been introduced to Japan via the Dutch trading post at Dejima. Alternatively, "Dutch" may simply mean "exotic" or "foreign" in this context.

== Description ==
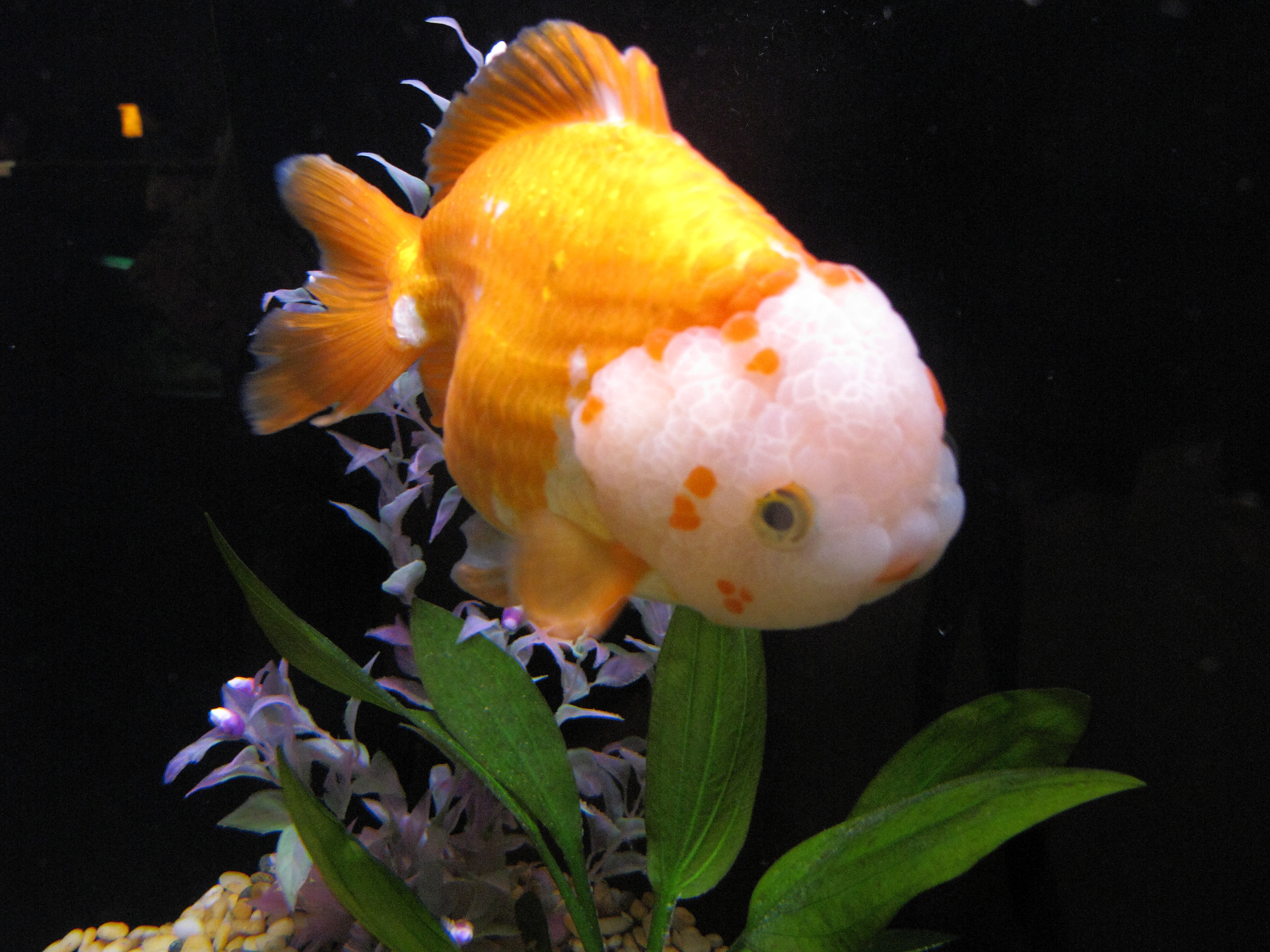
Orange oranda with a white full-faced cap ("wen")

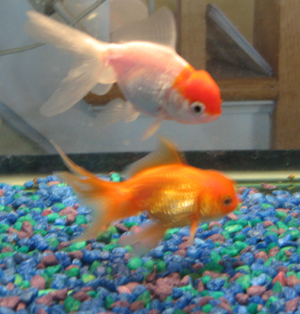
Common colors in orandas. The top one possessed a Tancho coloration while the bottom is orange.

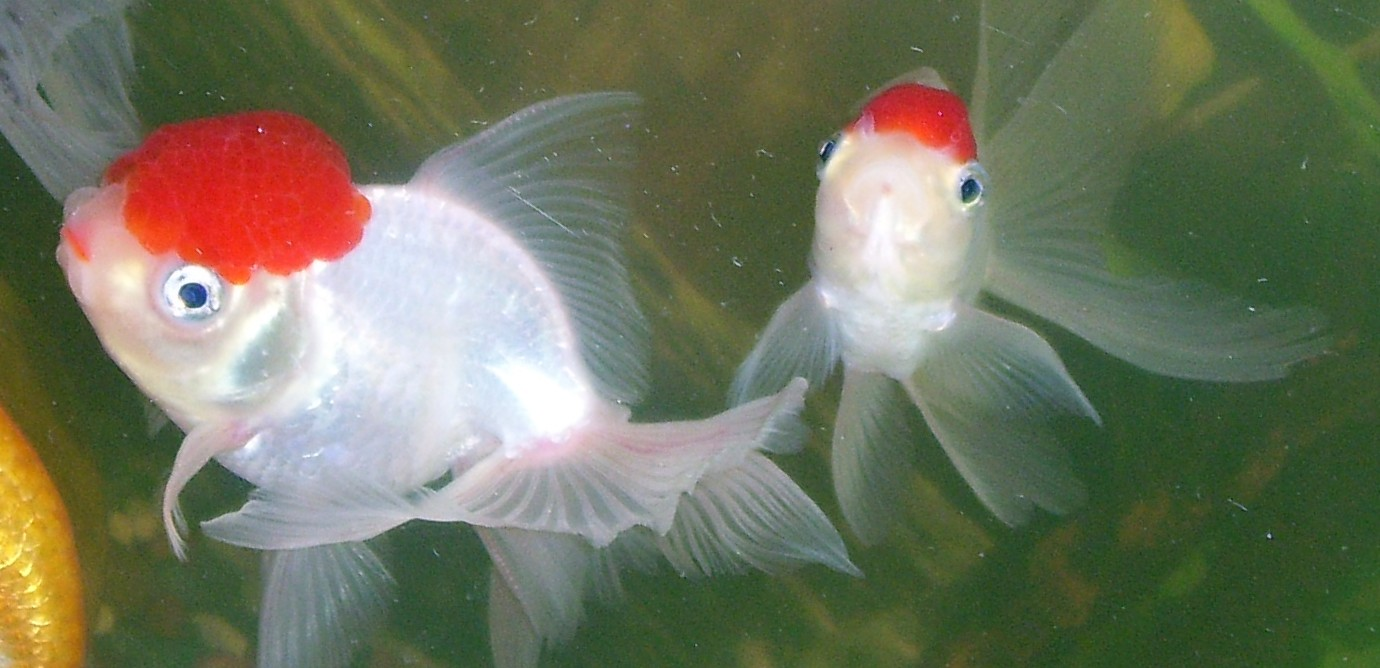
A pair of red-cap oranda goldfish. The one on the left has red-colored lips.

Due to the fleshy outgrowth on the upper half of its head and sides of its face, the oranda has become one of the most popular goldfish. The headgrowth is described as a "wen" by Chinese aquarists.

The oranda is a metallic or matte scaled goldfish that is similar in appearance to the veiltail. It has a large, long and deep body accompanied by a long quadruple tail. This four-lobed and contracted tail normally spreads out broadly when the oranda stops swimming. The back does not rise up to form a ryukin-like hump.

Orandas are available in a variety of colors, most often orange, red, red-and-white, red-and-black, black, blue, chocolate, bronze, white or silver, black-and-white (panda-colored), red-black-and-white (tricolor), and calico colors.

The headgrowth of young fry may take one to two years to develop. The oranda can reach 20 to 31 centimeters (7.9 to 12.2 inches) in length. Sometimes the wen grows enormously, covering the eyes of the goldfish. Due to this, the fish may have only limited eyesight or even become blind. Special care should be given to the wen because it is prone to bacterial infections. The Oranda can tolerate temperatures from 17 to 28 °C (63 to 82 °F). More recently blue scale oranda have been developed but these fish are very rare.

== Variants ==
- The azuma nishiki is an attractive nacreous-colored form of the oranda.
- The red-cap oranda has a silverish white body with a prominent red headgrowth on the forehead.
- Chinese breeders have developed telescope eyed orandas, a cross-breeding of the telescope eye and oranda goldfish.
- The hana fusa or pompom oranda is a pompom with a dorsal fin and headgrowth like an oranda. It is a cross between the oranda and a dorsal formed pompom.
- The nagate oranda is a long body oranda developed in Shikoku, south west area of Japan.
- The Apache oranda is a form of oranda that bears both red and black together. Fish cannot be named Apaches if the blackness only exists on the fin/s.
- The panda oranda is a variety of oranda that is bi-colored or tri-colored, most identifiable by the black-and-white coloration for which it is named.
- The Ingot oranda, also known as the Yuan-Bao oranda, is a new Chinese variety of oranda that was crossed from a ryukin with a Ranchu. Its large, short round body has the characteristics of a Ranchu, with its box shaped face containing wen. Its tail is somewhat equal as to the ryukin, though generally short-finned ingots are very popular and widely produced today.
- The Chakin (チャキン), also named the chocolate oranda, is a colored variant of an oranda. It has brownish scales with a color like that of chocolate. Its actual name means Tea fish or Tea goldfish in Japanese.
- The Seibungyo (成分魚) or Seibun is a blue oranda, named for its bluish grey silver coloration. The "blue" is combined with both black areas on the outside skin, and black from the inside layers, to form a blue-like sheen.
- The black oranda is a currently developed color variety that is crossed from the black moor.
- The jade seal oranda is a type of color pattern that consists of a white, clear cap on its head, while the rest of the body is red or orange.

== Special care ==
Orandas are sensitive to low water temperatures and can be kept with other goldfish. If their wen grows too much, it may hinder vision, so it is advised to keep them with other goldfish with similarly poor vision in order to make sure that they do not starve because of the able-sighted competition. Some aquarists prefer to trim the wen off of the goldfish by using scissors to prevent blindness and dousing with peroxide to prevent damaging essential areas around the face or body. Their wen is also susceptible to injury from rough objects placed in their residence.
