= Blackmore (disambiguation) =

Blackmore is a village in Essex, England.

Blackmore or Blackmoor may also refer to:

- Blackmore (name), a surname (including a list of people with the name)
- Blackmoor, Hampshire, a village in the East Hampshire district of Hampshire, England
- Blackmoor, an area of Astley, Greater Manchester
- Blackmore, Northern Territory, an outer rural locality in Darwin, Northern Territory, Australia
- Blackmore, Shropshire, a location in England
- Blackmoor Gate, a hamlet in Devon
  - Blackmoor railway station, a former station near Blackmoor Gate
- Blackmoor (campaign setting), a fantasy role-playing game setting
- Blackmoor (supplement), a 1975 supplementary rule book for the game Dungeons & Dragons
- HMS Blackmore, either of two ships
- Mount Blackmore, a mountain in Gallatin National Forest, Montana, United States
- Blackmoor (novel), a novel by Edward Hogan (writer)

== See also ==
- Black Moor (disambiguation)
- Blackamoors (disambiguation)
- Blakemore (disambiguation)
