= Black Marsh =

Black Marsh may refer to:

- a region near the Hoarstones in Shropshire, England
- an area of North Point State Park, Maryland, United States
- a fictional province in The Elder Scrolls series

== See also ==
- Black Bog
- Black Swamp
- Black Moor (disambiguation)
