= Blackamoors =

Blackamoors may refer to:

- Blackamoor (decorative arts), stylized depictions of black Africans in the decorative arts and jewelry
- Blackmoor (campaign setting), a fantasy roleplaying game campaign setting
- Blackmoor (supplement), a 1975 supplementary rulebook for Dungeons & Dragons
- Blackamoor, Lancashire, a village in England
- Blacka Moor, a moor in South Yorkshire, England
- Black tetra, a small fish also called a blackamoor (Gymnocorymbus ternetzi)
- Black Moor goldfish
- The Moor of Peter the Great, sometimes translated as The Blackamoor of Peter the Great
- Blackamoores, a 2013 book
- Moor's head or Maure, stylized depictions of black Africans in heraldry, sometimes called Blackamoors
- Moors, Muslims of Spain and North Africa

== See also ==
- Black Moor (disambiguation)
- Blackmore (disambiguation)
- Blakemore (disambiguation)
- Moor (disambiguation)
