= Vickrey =

Vickrey is a surname. Notable people with the surname include:

- Dan Vickrey (born 1966), American musician
- Jene Vickrey (born 1959), American politician
- Robert Vickrey (1926–2011), American painter
- William Vickrey (1914–1996), Canadian economist

== See also ==
- Vickrey auction, type of auction
- Vickrey–Clarke–Groves auction, type of auction
