= Bubble Eye =

Breed of goldfish

Bubble Eye Goldfish
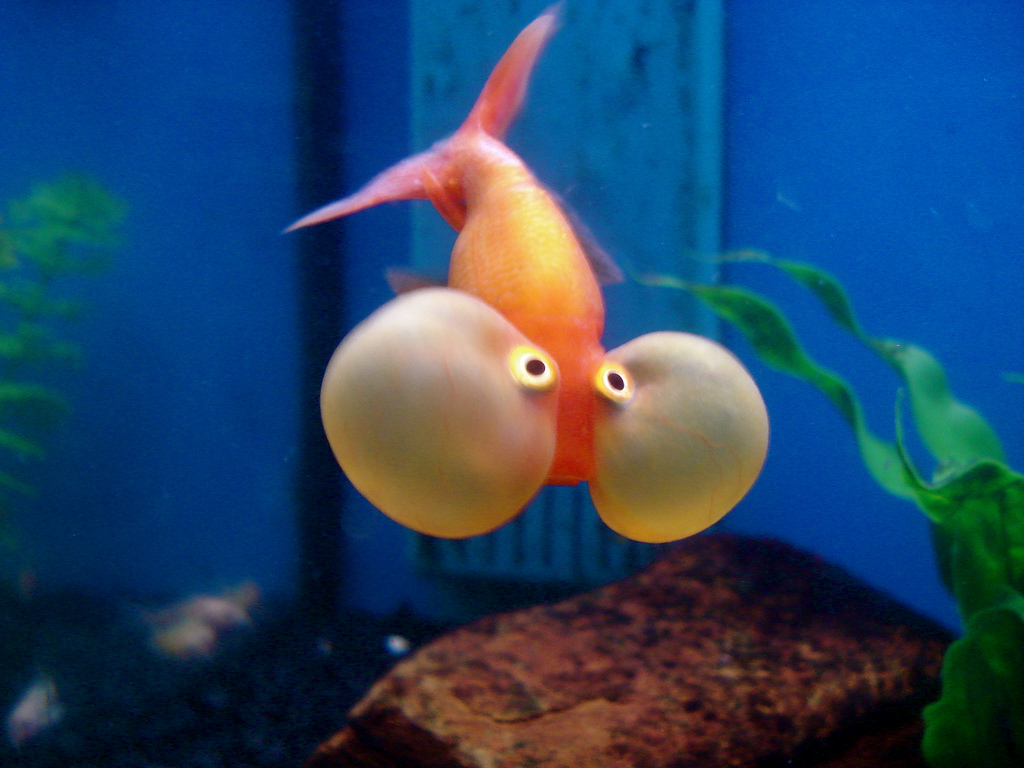
- Country of origin: China
- Type: Bubble eye

Classification
- BAS

The Bubble Eye is a small variety of fancy goldfish with upward-pointing eyes that are accompanied by two large fluid-filled sacs. It is a dorsal-less fish – good specimens will have a clean back and eye bubbles that match in color and size. Their bubbles are quite delicate, so the fish should be kept separately from boisterous types, as well as sharp tank decor. Although the bubbles will regrow if punctured, an injury could leave the fish prone to infections. The bubbles can disadvantage the fish as it is not a strong swimmer, with a seemingly low bobbing head at times; bubbles are infamous for being sucked into filters and siphons in an aquarium.

== Description ==
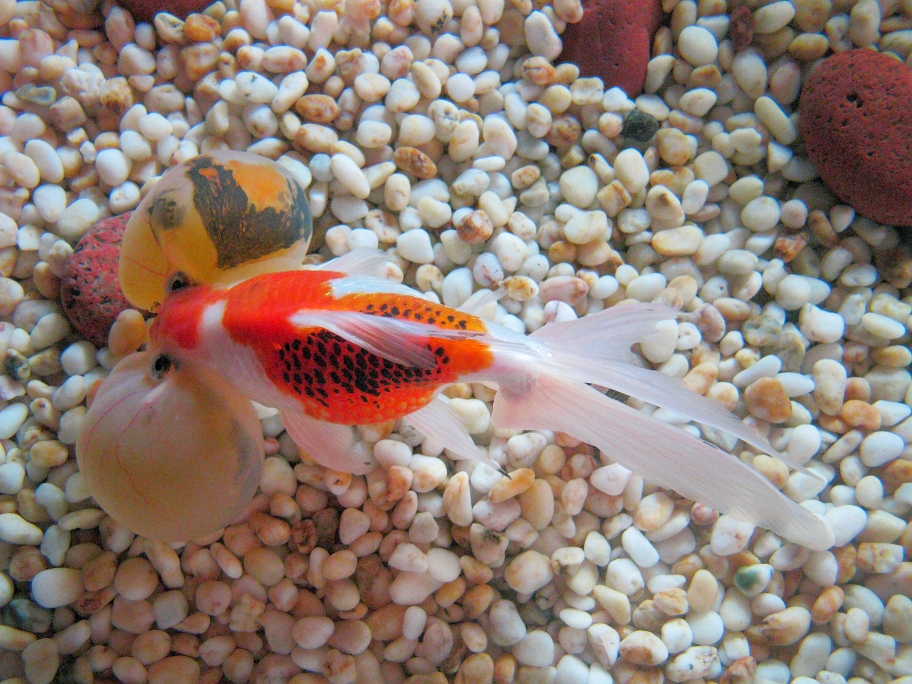
A bubble eye goldfish (with a dorsal fin) seen from the top

The Bubble Eye normally has an evenly curved back that lacks a dorsal fin. The pair of large pouches of skin attached under its eyes jiggle as it swims. Bubble Eyes have metallic scales, and they are similar to the celestial eye goldfish. The eyes of the Bubble Eye goldfish are normal in the young fry but will start to develop eye bladders three months after hatching. Like ranchu, the bubble eye goldfish lacks a dorsal fin and has a double tail. They normally grow up to 3 to 4 inches in length. If one of their "Bubbles" pop due to pressure or collision with a sharp object, there is a risk of infection where the inside of the sac has been exposed.

== Variants ==
The precursor to the Bubble Eye, known as the Toadhead or hama-tou, had upturned eyes and very small, bladder-like sacs. Through selective breeding, the bubble eye is currently available with either a long or more rounded body and the choice between matte, metallic or nacreous scales. A recent development of the bubble eye has four eye sacs rather than the usual two. Desirable colors for these fish include red, calico, orange, red and white, and the rare black.

== Care ==
Due to the delicate eye sacs, enthusiasts must ensure that their bubble eye is kept in aquariums free from sharp objects. Due to the fish's visual impairment, it is recommended that they are kept with other bubble eyes, black moors, demekins and celestial goldfish to ensure fair competition for food.

== Medical uses ==
Researchers in Japan have theorized that the liquid in the bubble eye's sacs could be a stimulant to cell growth. Due to the eye sac's ability to quickly regenerate and refill itself, scientists can milk the same fish every few months with a syringe.

== See also ==
- Celestial Eye
- Telescope (goldfish)
