= Celestial Eye =

Breed of goldfish

Celestial eye goldfish
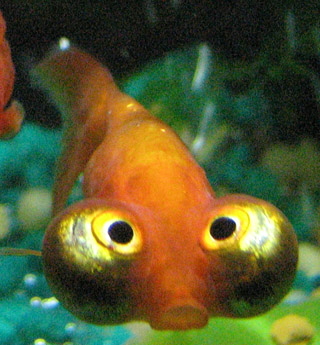
- Country of origin: China or Korea
- Type: Fantailed

Classification
- AGA
- BAS

The Celestial Eye goldfish or Choutengan is a double-tailed breed of fancy goldfish that possesses a distinctive pair of telescope eyes, in which the eyeballs are turned vertically and the pupils appear to be gazing skyward.

Upon hatching of celestial fry, the young fishes' eyes are positioned normally but gradually enlarge, such as with the telescope eye goldfish. However, the telescope-eye still gazes laterally; the celestial goldfish's pupils will shift to a near-vertical (at times, "cross-eyed") gaze within a six-month period after hatching, as the eyeballs are repositioned and the pupils are centered on the top of the head.

This process is entirely governed by genetics; early sources perpetuated the myth that the fish were bred in and contained within narrow-necked clay jars, with the eyes mutating upwards in search of what limited light they could receive.

== Origins ==
Celestials first appeared as a direct mutation of the telescope goldfish in the 18th century. It is still unclear as to where, exactly, this occurred first—in Korea or China. The earliest known documentation of a celestial existing appears on a Chinese scroll dated to 1772, in which a goldfish lacking a dorsal fin and possessing protuberant, upturned eyes is described.

Celestials did not arrive in Japan until 1903, at which time 30 specimens arrived from China and became the founding stock for Japanese breeders. Japan quickly became the leading producer of celestials for export, and remained so until the outbreak of WWII. The breed first arrived in the United States from Japan in the 1900s and 1910s, and were included in the first edition of Goldfish Varieties and Tropical Aquarium Fishes (1917) by William T. Innes. American fanciers successfully bred the fish and, in turn, exported foundational stock to Great Britain. After WWII, and ever since, the majority of celestial goldfish exported from Asia are of Chinese origin. A celestial is depicted on a postage stamp, issued in 1960, by the People's Republic of China.

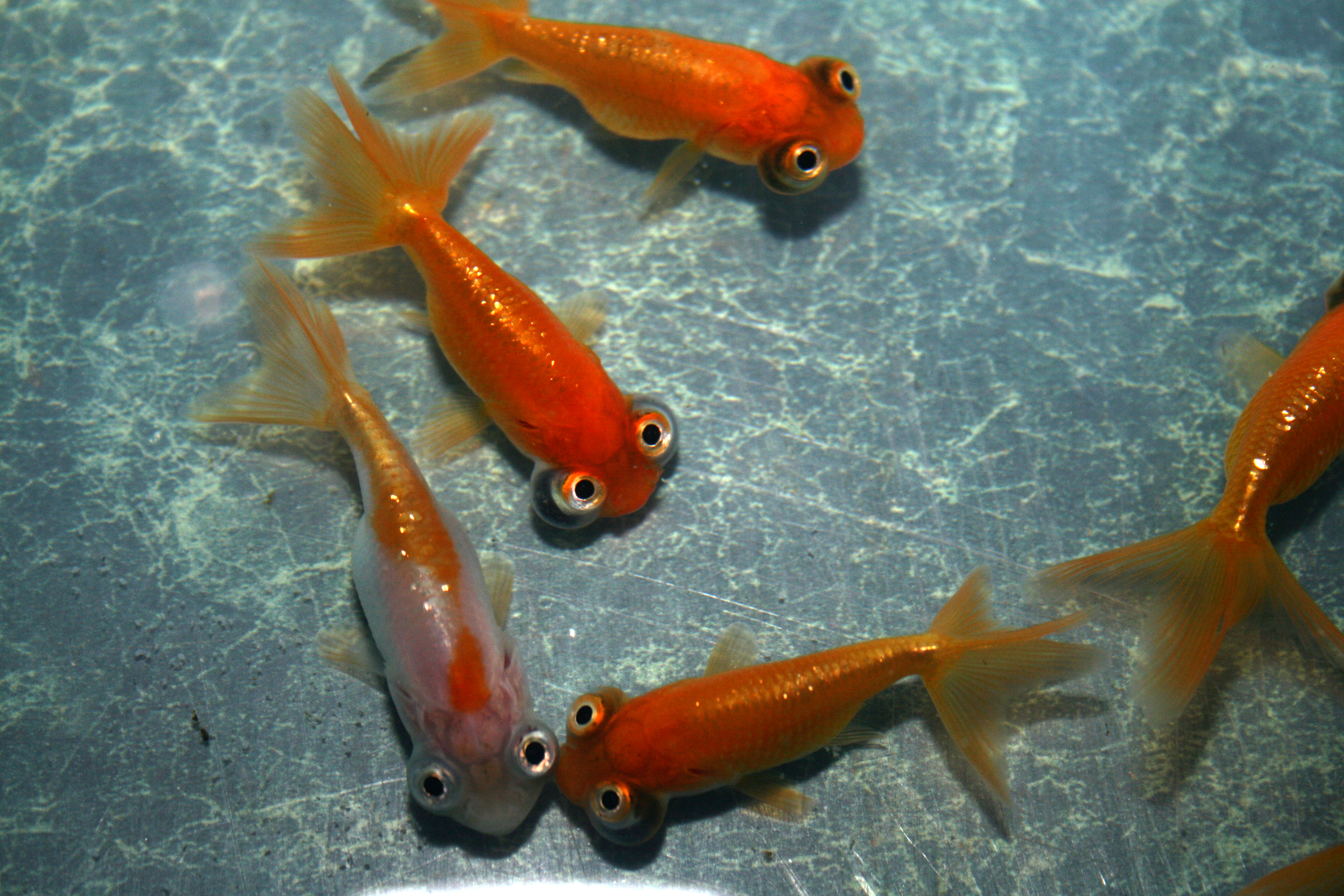
Group of celestial goldfish

== Description and physical traits ==
The celestial has an elongate, egg-shaped body similar to the bubble-eye. Similarly, the celestial does not have a dorsal fin. Their paired fins are of the fantail or ryukin type. The caudal fin may measure half as long to equally as long as the fish's body. They are most commonly seen with metallic scales, colored shades of orange (or 'red', to fanciers) and white, or red and white. Celestials with nacreous or shiny scales are known, but rarely seen.

Despite their visual and ocular differences, and lacking of a dorsal fin, celestials are as active and agile of swimmers as any goldfish. However, due to this vertically focused field of vision, celestials are unable to compete with more vigorous breeds of goldfish for food—including telescope-eye goldfish—thus are best kept in their own setup or with bubble-eye breeds.

Additionally, as their eyeballs are extremely large and vulnerable to injury—thus affecting their ability to navigate perfectly while swimming—care must be taken to protect celestials from sharp rocks, gravel, driftwood, artificial plants with sharp edges, or other such decor. Smooth-bottomed aquariums with silk decorative plants are best; live plants are also beneficial, provided their foliage is not sharp or hard in any way, though may become problematic for many keepers of goldfish; as a whole, goldfish are known to be curious to the point of being destructive, even eating any plant they come across. However, live plants may be successfully grown when kept with smaller or juvenile goldfish, and have the added benefit of neutralizing ammonia, nitrates and other substances brought about by fish waste. Appropriate species may include epiphytic, soft-leaved genera such as Anubias, Bolbitis ('African water ferns'), Bucephalandra or Leptochilus ('Java ferns', formerly Microsorum), as they may be attached to smooth rocks or non-jagged pieces of driftwood, minimizing the need for excessive decor or a rich substrate. Some larger specimens of Cryptocoryne or Echinodorus (the 'Amazon swords') may be safe from damage by smaller goldfish, but are not epiphytes, thus requiring a richer, more organic substrate to thrive. Although many enthusiasts consider goldfish to be "cold-water" fishes, celestials are also somewhat more sensitive to temperature fluctuations, preferring their water to remain in the lower to mid-70s °F (i.e., between 21 °C and 23.89 °C).

== Variants ==
The original Celestial breed, described above, is still bred and exported by Chinese and Japanese breeders and is commercially available to fanciers, though they are not as commonly stocked by aquarium shops and dealers as some other goldfish varieties. It is this 240+ year old form that is described in the American standard adopted by the American Goldfish Association and the Goldfish Society of America. British fanciers prefer their Celestials to have deeper bodies and shorter fins, and have selectively bred for these features as required by the British standard. Chinese breeders have crossed Celestials with several other breeds, most commonly Lionheads, Ranchus and Pompoms, producing much larger fish with short ranchu-like fins and very deep, blocky bodies, often with nasal 'bouquets' (pompoms) and rudimentary head growths.

Some of these crosses tend to be less animated swimmers, especially those that possess a short, sharply downturned, ranchu-like caudal peduncle with flared and short caudal fins, traits which are otherwise uncharacteristic for the breed. Such fish can be quite sedentary, spending most of their time at or near the bottom of the aquarium; however, a more expansive color range can be found among these hybrids, with metallic specimens appearing in chocolate, black and various bi-colors in addition to the standard metallic colors, and nacreous fish seen in bi-color, tri-color and calico. These hybrids are not generally available commercially outside Asia but can be acquired through specialist dealers and importers. The Deme-ranchu is identical to the Celestial in conformation save for its telescopic eyes which do not turn upward. In any spawning of Celestials, many fry will be found to mature with telescopic eyes that never turn upwards. These fish are identical to deme-ranchu. The Toadhead or Hama-tou in Japanese, is similar to the Celestial in having upward-turned eyes, though they are not protuberant, each supporting a small bubble-like growth sacs beneath it. It is believed to be the ancestor to both the celestial eye and bubble eye goldfish.

== See also ==
- Bubble Eye
- Telescope (goldfish)
