= Veiltail =

Breed of goldfish

Veiltail goldfish
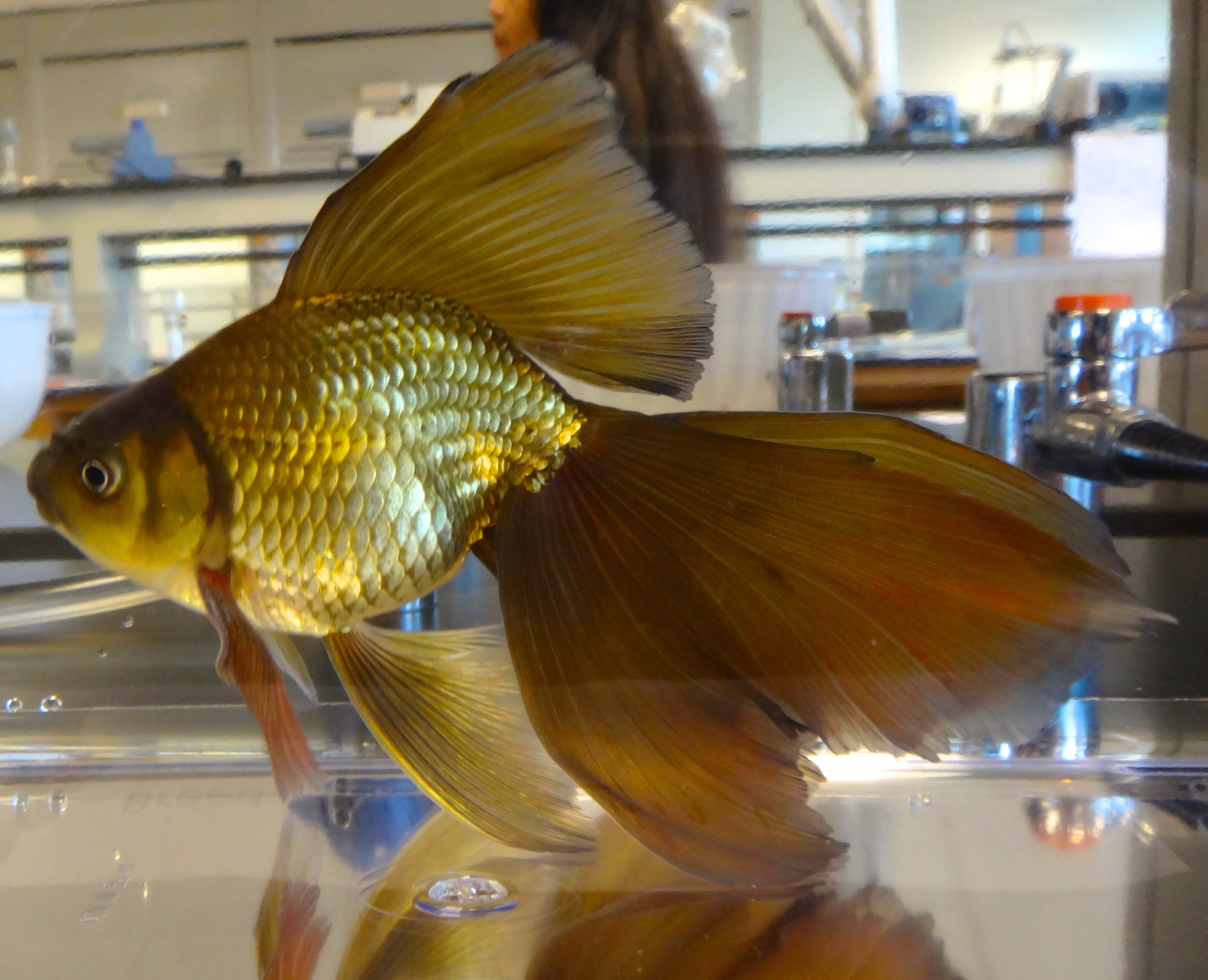
- Country of origin: United States
- Type: Veiltailed

Classification
- BAS

The veiltail is a type of goldfish known for its extra-long, flowing double tail and high sail-like dorsal fin.

== Description ==
The veiltail has a modified deep-and-round ryukin-shaped body, though without the dorsal 'hump' characteristic of ryukins. The hallmark of the breed is its lengthy and graceful double tail which is square-edged and without any forking or indentation between the lobes.

It also has a high, prominent and well-developed dorsal fin. The anal fins are paired and are quite well developed as well. The term 'veiltail' is commonly and erroneously applied to any goldfish displaying a long caudal, but true veiltails must have all the characteristics described above. Veiltails are available in many colors and may have either metallic or nacreous scales. They can grow from 8 to 12 inches (20 to 30 cm). They are not good swimmers but can be kept with other fancy goldfish. Veiltails will not accept temperatures below 55 °F (13 °C).

== History and origins ==
The veiltail, a name coined by William T. Innes, originated in the United States in the 1890s when Franklin Barrett of Philadelphia crossed a Japanese-bred fringetail ryukin to a telescope eye goldfish that exhibited a short, square-edged caudal. According to William Seale this fringetail was one of many imported by the Wisconsin State Fish Commission for the World's Fair. However, these fish became sick with fungus and were not shown in the 1893 fair. Mr. Seale saved 5 or 6 of these fish and returned home to Philadelphia with them. Mr. Seale then sold one of these fish to Franklin Barrett for $15 and this was the fish Barrett used to cross to a short but square tailed telescope eye goldfish. The telescope eye goldfish used for this cross were obtained as imports by John Cugley of Philadelphia. This resulted in a strain of fish soon to be known throughout the world as Philadelphia veiltails. Although some have suggested that Philadelphia Veiltails died out in America, a man named Al Thomma was able to obtain stock from a John (Andy) W. Anderson of Philadelphia who possessed fish from the original Barrett line. Mr. Anderson worked for Innes Publishing as advertising editor and publisher of The Aquarium Magazine. Through the work of Al Thomma and Al Foster. The Philadelphia Veiltail still exists today.

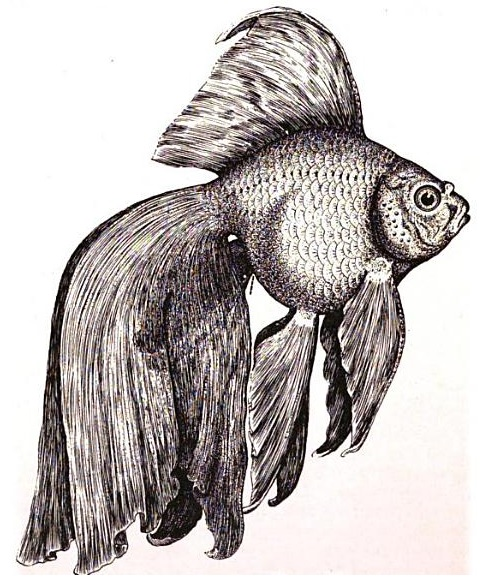
Drawing of Franklin Barrett's original Japanese fringetail, which was used to breed the veiltail

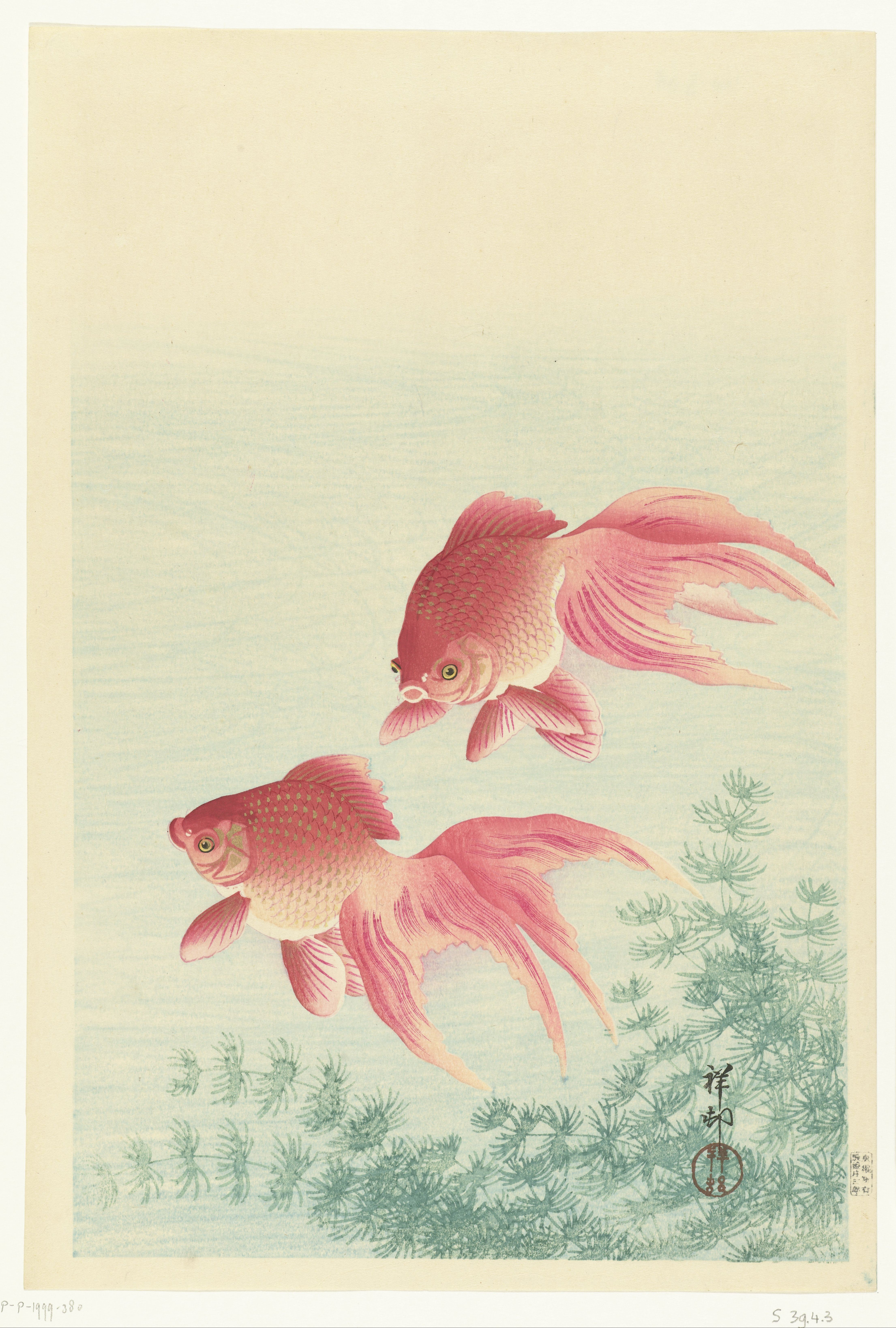
Two Veiltail Goldish, Japanese painting by Ohara Koson, 1900–1930

== Variants ==
Apart from those bred and developed in the United States, there are now also Chinese and English strains. They can also occur with normal or telescope-eyes.

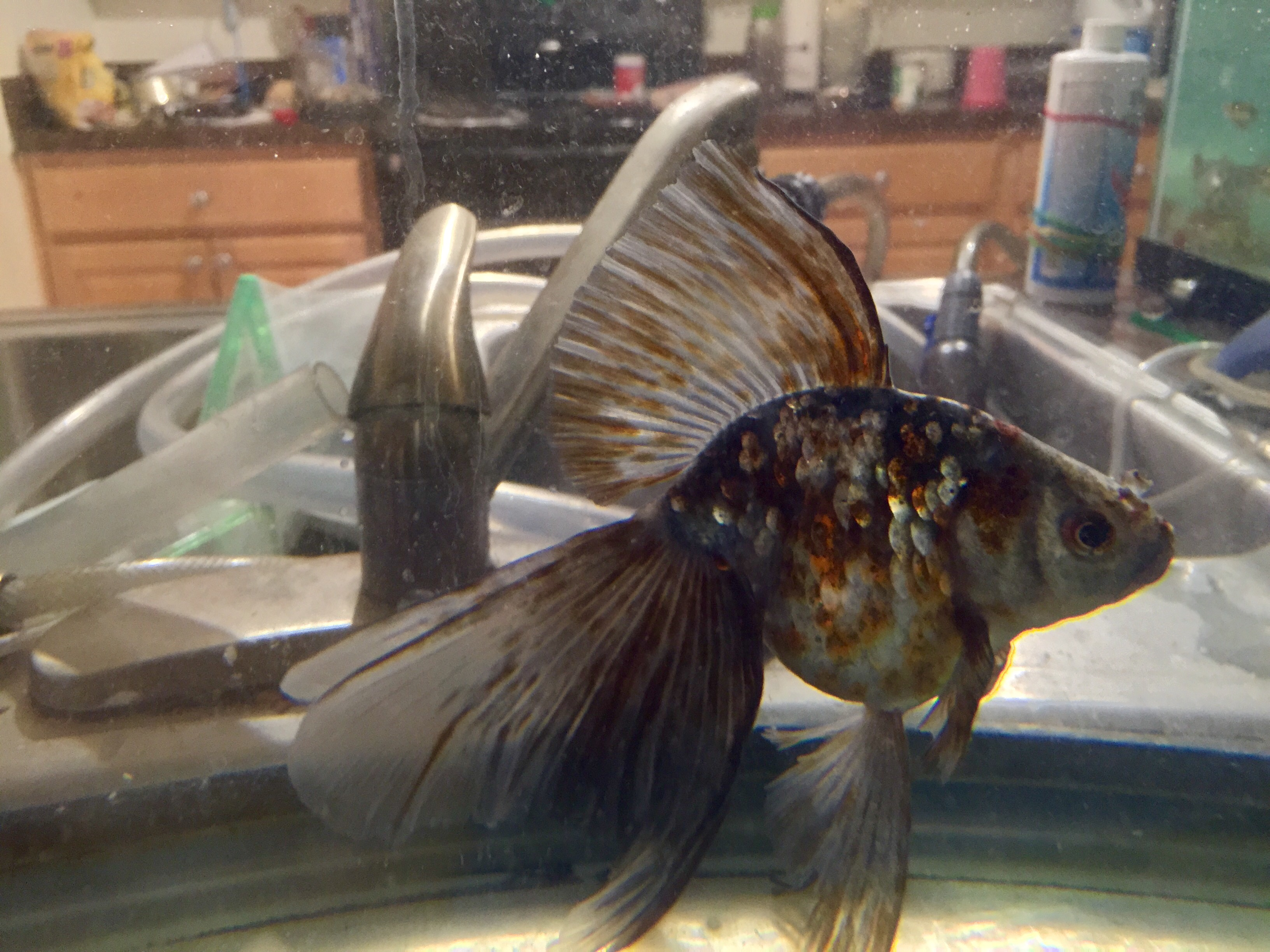
Chinese veiltail

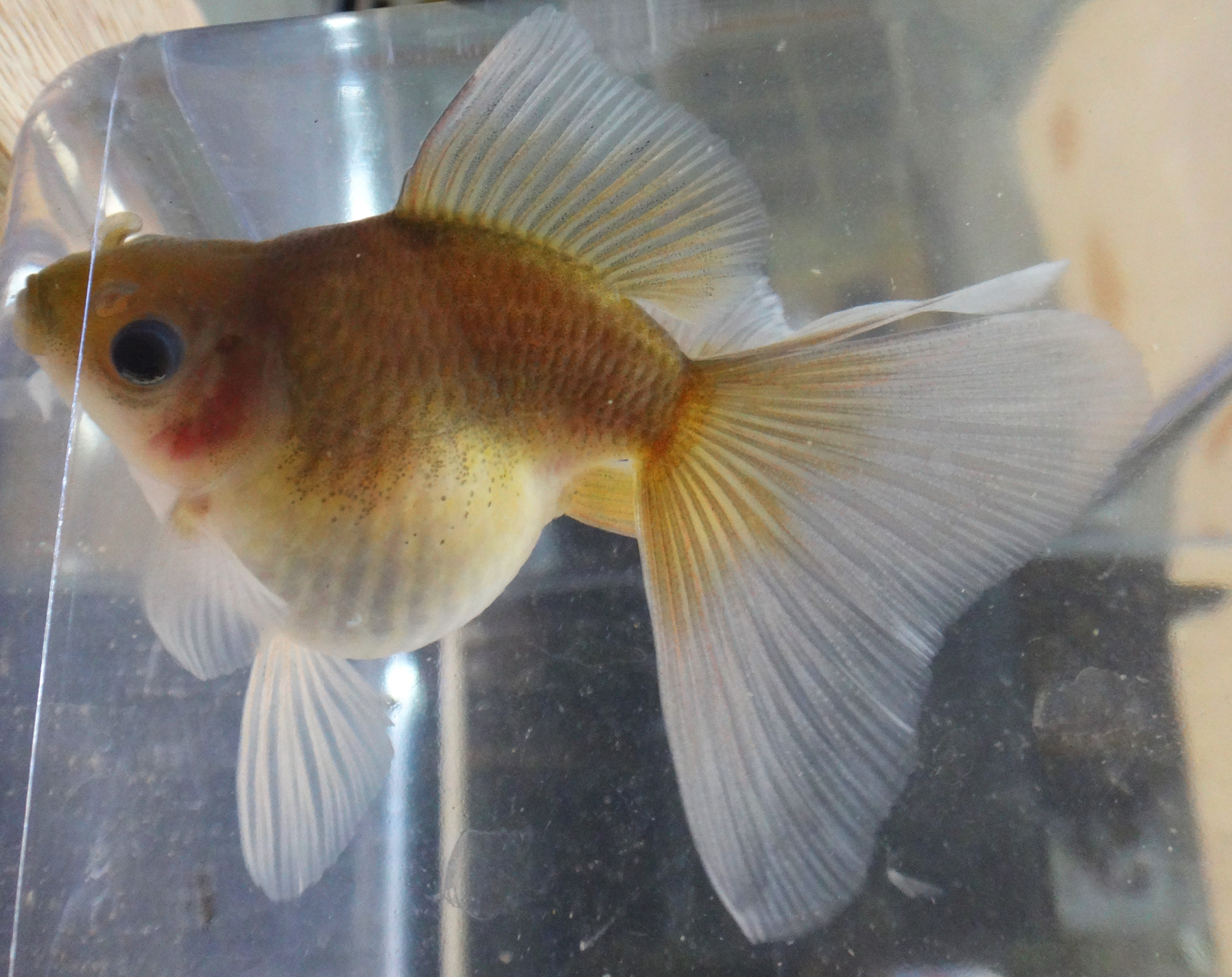
English veiltail

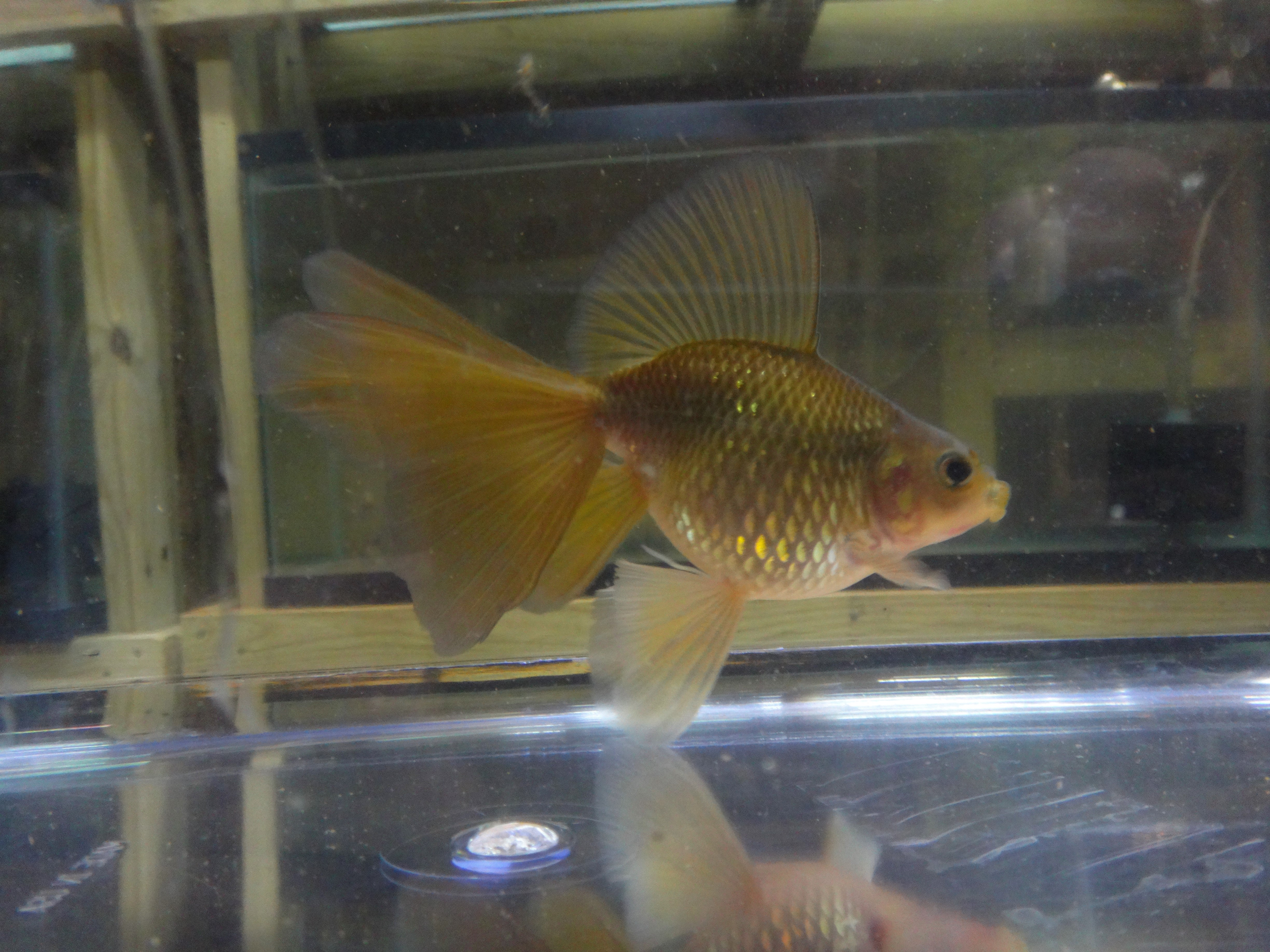
English veiltail with metallic color

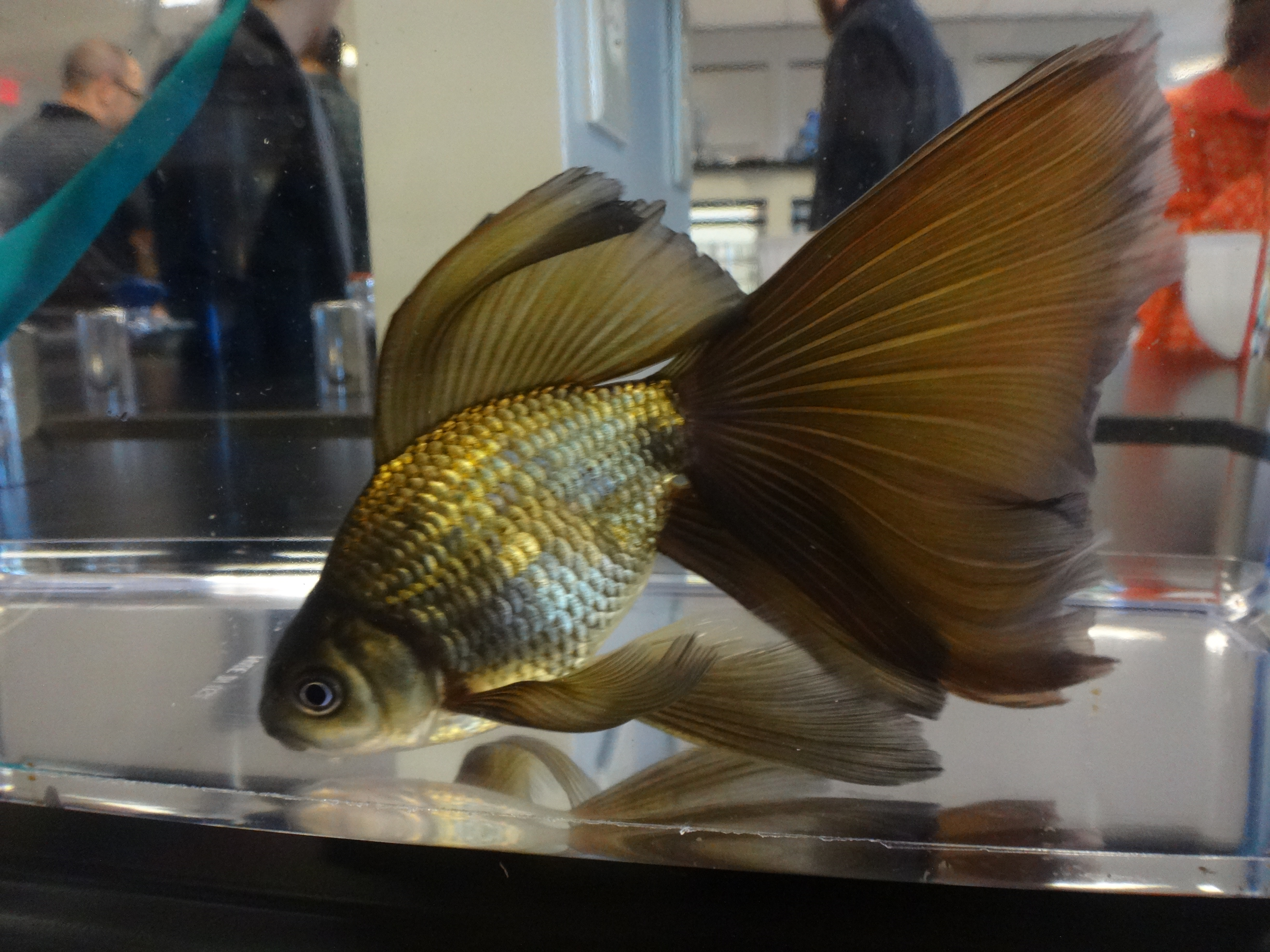
Philadelphia veiltail

== Special care ==
The long and trailing tail of the veiltail is delicate and can be easily damaged. Veiltails are also susceptible to low water temperatures. Telescope-eyed veiltails have difficulty competing for food with more active goldfish.
