= Black Moor =

Black Moor may refer to:

- Black Moor (musical group), a heavy metal band
- Black Moor (Rhön), a wetland habitat in Germany
- Black Telescope goldfish, known as black moor, a variant of telescope eye goldfish
- "Harap Alb", a 1877 Romanian-language fairy tale

== See also ==
- Blackmore
- Blackamoors (disambiguation)
- White Moor (disambiguation)
