= Samantha Poetter Parshall =

American politician

Samantha Poetter

Member of the Kansas House of Representatives from the 6th district
- Incumbent
- Assumed office January 11, 2021
- Preceded by: Clifford Blackmore

Personal details
- Party: Republican
- Education: Kansas State University (BA)

Samantha M. Poetter is an American politician serving as a member of the Kansas House of Representatives from the 6th district. Elected in November 2020, she assumed office on January 11, 2021.

== Early life and education ==
A first-generation American, Poetter was raised in Paola, Kansas, where her parents owned a restaurant. Poetter earned a Bachelor of Science degree in political science and government from Kansas State University.

== Career ==
As an undergraduate, Poetter worked as an intern in the office of the Secretary of State of Kansas. She then worked as a campaign staffer for Senator Pat Roberts. Poetter later served as the communications director for Secretary of State Kris Kobach. In 2016, Poetter became chair of Kansans for Conservative Values, a conservative political action committee.

2021-2022 Kansas House of Representatives Committee Assignments

- Federal and State Affairs
- Taxation
- Corrections and Juvenile Justice
