= Frances Blakemore =

American art collector

Frances Lee Wismer Baker Blakemore
- Frances Blakemore circa 1980
- Born: Frances Lee Wismer; June 19, 1906; Pana, Illinois
- Died: August 1, 1997 (aged 91); Seattle, Washington
- Resting place: Floral Hills Cemetery, Lynnwood, Washington
- Education: University of Washington
- Occupation: Artist
- Spouse: Thomas Blakemore

Frances Blakemore (1906 – 1997; also published as Frances Baker and Frances Wismer) was an American-born artist, writer, curator, and art collector who spent more than 50 years of her life in Japan.

== Early life and career ==
She was born Frances Lee Wismer in Pana, Illinois, to George Wismer, a German immigrant, and his wife Emma. In 1908, after her father won 80 acres of homestead land in a lottery, the Wismer family moved to Spokane, Washington, and opened a lunchroom. Her father died in a car accident in 1915, when Frances was nine years old. Her mother later remarried and moved the family to Mabton, Washington. Frances graduated from high school in 1924. She worked her way through the art department of the University of Washington, receiving a Bachelor of Arts degree in 1935.

During her more than ten years as a part-time student, she taught private art classes, worked as a substitute art teacher at the university, sold handmade jewelry, illustrated children's books, and designed graphic art for area businesses. In 1929 she exhibited a set of linoleum block prints at the first annual exhibition of the Northwest Printmakers and won the Purchase Prize for her print, High Water at Moore's Point, Chelan. The following year she collaborated with Seattle artist Grace Perry to publish Twelve Block Prints of Lake Chelan.

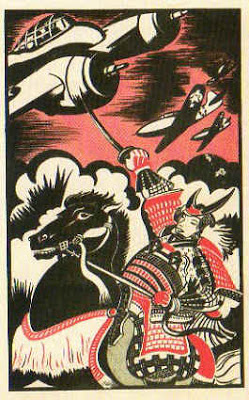
Illustration from a propaganda leaflet designed by Frances Blakemore, 1940s.

While her fellow art students dreamed of living in Paris, she was fascinated with Japan. Soon after graduating from college, she married Glenn Frederic Baker, a graduate student, and moved with him to Tokyo, where they taught art and English at Hosei University, Keio University, and Waseda High School. She also earned money by drawing weekly sketches for Japan News Week and painting murals. She continued making block prints and exhibiting with the Northwest Printmakers. In 1940 she left Japan to avoid being arrested and interned, and spent World War II living in Honolulu, where she worked for the Office of War Information designing airborne leaflet propaganda for distribution in Japan.

== Life in Japan ==
She returned to Tokyo in 1946 and went to work for the Civil Information and Education (CI&E) Division of the Supreme Commander for the Allied Powers (SCAP) during the occupation of Japan, designing brochures and posters to promote the reconstruction project. In 1949, she wrote and illustrated Jeeper's Japan, a book of humorous rhyming couplets about life in occupied Japan. After the occupation she worked as director of exhibits for the American embassy in Tokyo. In 1952, she collaborated with Oliver Statler on an exhibition called Modern Prints, which toured the United States and introduced many Americans to the Japanese sōsaku-hanga (creative print) movement. Around this time she switched from block printing to screen printing and the occasional collagraph or etching.

In 1954 she married Thomas Blakemore, an American-born corporate lawyer. She and her husband founded the Franell Gallery (1965-1984), located in the Hotel Okura Tokyo. The gallery focused on the work of modern Japanese printmakers including Yoshitoshi Mori and Tadashi Nakayama. She continued to make her own screen prints and abstract paintings, and made her first solo exhibition at the International House of Japan in 1960. She also collected Japanese textiles and stencils, which were exhibited throughout the United States and Australia. In the 1970s, she published two books on Japanese design, both of which were reprinted four times.

In the Japan Times, Donald Richie wrote in 2008, "Blakemore's style was modernist in that it derived from Cezanne...and the mild cubism seen in another influence, Diego Rivera. This was much molded, however, by what she had seen and studied in Japan, and the Mingei (folk crafts) theories of her friends Soetsu Yanagi and Shoji Hamada. In particular, the early and decorative cubist interest was transformed by Blakemore's enthusiasm for katagami, Japanese hand-cut stencils."

== Later years and death ==
In the 1980s, the Blakemores retired to Seattle, where they spent the rest of their lives. In 1990, they co-founded the Blakemore Foundation, which grants scholarships for the study of East and Southeast Asian languages to American citizens and permanent residents. Following her husband's death in 1994, Blakemore donated her art collection, which included her own art as well as hundreds of Japanese prints and textiles, to the Seattle Art Museum, the Burke Museum of Natural History and Culture, and the Henry Art Gallery. Frances Blakemore died on August 1, 1997, aged 91.

A biography of Blakemore was published in 2007 by the Blakemore Foundation and the University of Washington. In 2011, Blakemore and her war propaganda leaflets were featured in an episode of the PBS series, History Detectives.

== Published works ==
- Twelve Block Prints of Lake Chelan. Prosser, Washington: H.P. Hamaker. 1930.
- We the Blitzed: A Diary in Cartoons of Hawaii at War. Honolulu: Advertiser Publishing Company, Limited. 1943.
- Jeeper's Japan. Tokyo: Toppan. 1949.
- Who's Who in Modern Japanese Prints. Weatherhill. 1975.
- Japanese Design: Through Textile Patterns. Weatherhill. 1978.
