= University of Toledo College of Medicine and Life Sciences =

Medical school in Toledo, Ohio, US

The University of Toledo College of Medicine and Life Sciences
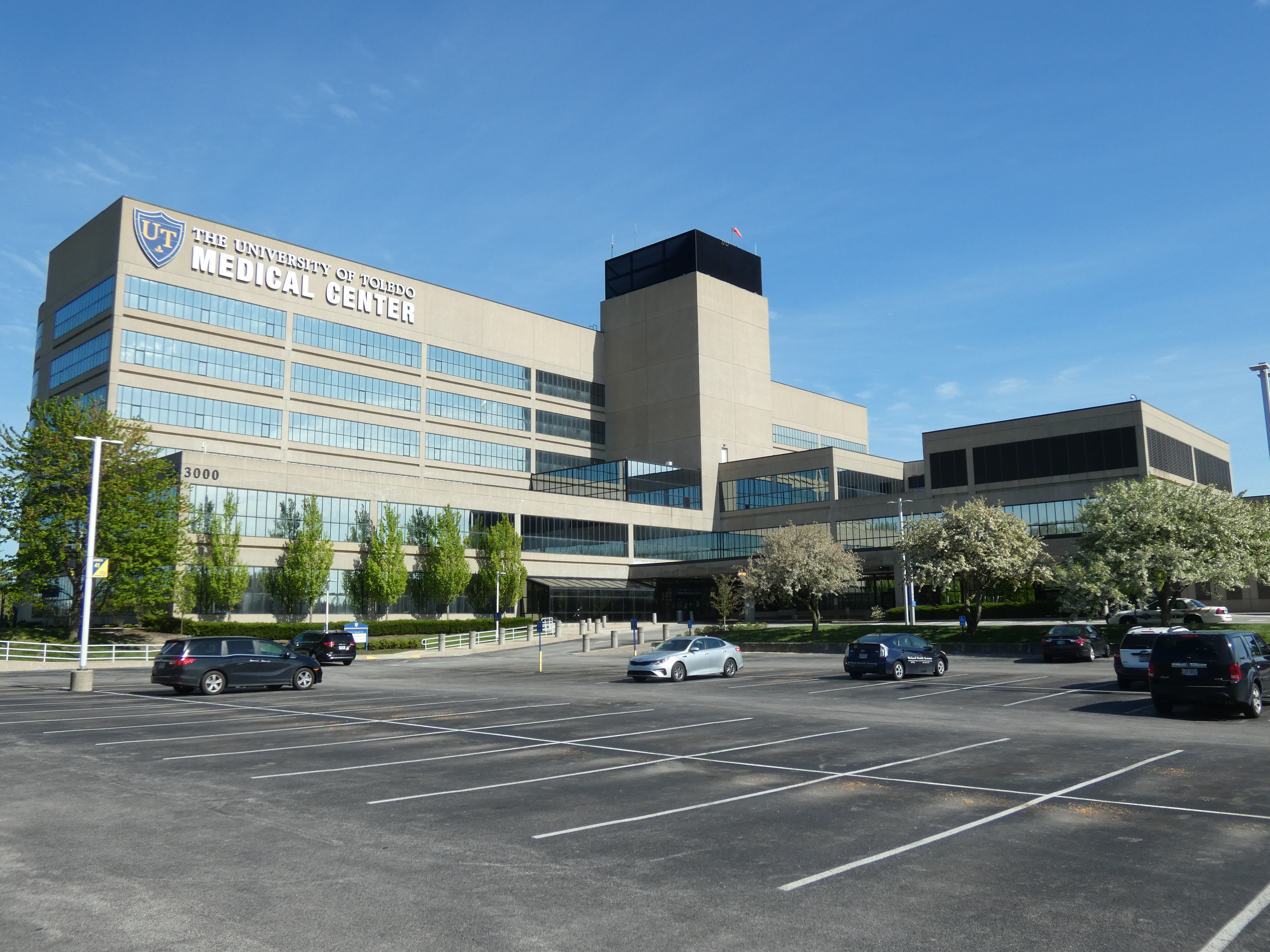
- Former names: Medical University of Ohio, Medical College of Ohio, Toledo State College of Medicine,
- Type: Public, Medical School
- Established: 1964
- Parent institution: University of Toledo
- Dean: Imran Ali, M.D., FAAN, FAES
- Location: Toledo, OH, USA; 41°37′11″N 83°37′01″W
- Website: utoledo.edu/med

The University of Toledo College of Medicine and Life Sciences is a medical school affiliated with the University of Toledo, a public university located in Toledo, Ohio, United States. The College is located on the University of Toledo's Health Science Campus in south Toledo.

== History ==
Founded in 1964 as the Medical College of Ohio (MCO), its first class of medical students began their studies in 1969.

On March 31, 2006, Ohio Governor Bob Taft signed House Bill 478, which merged the University of Toledo with what was then known as the Medical University of Ohio (MUO), effective July 1, 2006.

Upon completion of the merger, the University of Toledo became the third largest member of the University System of Ohio in terms of operating budget, as well as one of only 17 public universities in the United States having colleges of business administration, education, engineering, law, medicine and pharmacy.

== Academic Affiliation ==
In 2016, The University of Toledo began an affiliation with Toledo-based health system ProMedica. The partnership establishes a 50-year affiliation between the College and the health system to "attract and retain good medical talent in Toledo."

== Academic and Clinical Departments ==
- Anesthesiology
- Biochemistry and Cancer Biology
- Dentistry
- Emergency Medicine
- Family Medicine
- Internal Medicine
- Medical Microbiology and Immunology
- Neurology
- Neurosciences
- Obstetrics and Gynecology
- Orthopaedic Surgery
- Otolaryngology
- Pathology
- Pediatrics
- Physician Assistant
- Physiology and Pharmacology
- Psychiatry
- Radiation Oncology
- Radiology
- Surgery
- Urology

== Notable alumni ==
- Karin J. Blakemore, medical geneticist
- Jerri Nielsen (née Cahill), Antarctic physician
