= White Moor =

White Moor may refer to:

- Beidane, an Arabic term for light-skinned people in Mauritania
- Harap Alb, a Romanian-language fairy tale

== See also ==
- Black Moor (disambiguation)
