= Jene Vickrey =

American politician

Member of the Kansas House of Representatives from the 6th district
- In office January 11, 1993 – July 7, 2020
- Preceded by: Marvin Barkis
- Succeeded by: Clifford Blackmore

Personal details
- Born: August 8, 1959 (age 66) Kansas City, Missouri, U.S.
- Party: Republican
- Spouse: Teresa Vickrey
- Profession: Flooring Sales
- Website: Jene Vickrey website

Jene Vickrey (born August 8, 1959) is a former Republican member of the Kansas House of Representatives, representing the 6th district. He served from 1993 until his resignation in July 2020 following his decision not to seek re-election in 2020. He is a former House Majority Leader and speaker pro tempore of the House of Representatives.

Vickrey has served in the American Legion Exchange Council, National Federation of Independent Business and Springhill Chamber of Commerce. He was also a charter member of the Louisberg Rotary Club. The American Conservative Union gave him a lifetime rating of 83%. On July 7, 2020, Vickrey resigned from the Kansas House of Representatives after having served for twenty-eight years.

== Committee membership ==
=== 2019-2021 ===
- Chairman of Insurance
- Rural Revitalization
- Education

=== 2015 ===
During the 2015 Legislative Session, Vickrey served on the following Committees:

- Calendar and Printing (Chair)
- Interstate Cooperation
- Legislative Budget
- Legislative Coordinating Council

=== 2013-2014 ===
During the 2013-2014 Legislative Sessions, Vickrey served on the following committees:

- Calendar and Printing (Chair)
- Interstate Cooperation
- Legislative Budget
- Legislative Coordinating Council

=== 2011-2012 ===
During the 2011-2012 Legislative Sessions, Vickrey served on the following committees:

- Calendar and Printing
- Interstate Cooperation (Vice-chair)
- Joint Legislative Coordinating Council
- Legislative Budget

=== 2009-2010 ===
During the 2009-2010 Legislative Sessions, Vickrey served on the following committees:

- Transportation (Vice-chair)
- Education
- Government Efficiency and Fiscal Oversight
- Joint Legislative Coordinating Council

== Elections ==
=== 2012 ===
Vickrey won re-election in 2012, running unopposed in both the August 7 Republican primary and in the general election on November 6, 2012.

=== 2010 ===
Vickrey won re-election to House District 6 in 2010 with no opposition. He was also unopposed in the Republican primary. The general election was on November 2, 2010.

=== 2008 ===
On November 4, 2008, Vickrey was re-elected to House District 6 with no opposition. He raised $26,849 for his campaign.

== Major donors ==
The top 5 donors to Vickrey's 2008 campaign:

- 1. Kansas Contractors Assoc $1,000
- 2. Burlington Northern Santa Fe Railway $500
- 3. Nolan, RC $500
- 4. Kansas Medical Society $500
- 5. Wal-Mart $500
