= Ernest Blackmore =

English cricketer

Personal information
- Full name: Ernest George Blackmore
- Born: 12 May 1895; Bedminster, Somerset, England
- Died: October 1955; Pretoria, South Africa
- Batting: Right-handed
- Role: Bowler

Domestic team information
- Years: Team
- 1925: Gloucestershire

Career statistics
Competition	FC
Matches	3
Runs scored	11
Batting average
100s/50s
Top score
Balls bowled
Wickets	2
Bowling average
5 wickets in innings
10 wickets in match
Best bowling
Catches/stumpings
- Source: Cricinfo, 4 August 2013

Ernest Blackmore (12 May 1895 – October 1955) was an English cricketer. He played three matches for Gloucestershire in 1925.
