= Clifford Blackmore =

American politician

Member of the Kansas House of Representatives from the 6th district
- In office July 27, 2020 – January 11, 2021
- Preceded by: Jene Vickrey
- Succeeded by: Samantha Poetter

Personal details
- Party: Republican

Clifford Blackmore is an American politician and businessman who served as a member of the Kansas House of Representatives from 2020 to 2021.

== Career ==
Blackmore was appointed to the Kansas House by Republican Party committee members in Miami County following the resignation of former Rep. Jene Vickrey in July 2020. Blackmore was sworn in on July 27, 2020, following his formal appointment by Governor Laura Kelly.

Blackmore was defeated in the August 4, 2020 Republican primary for the sixth district seat by Samantha Poetter, a former aide to Kansas Secretary of State Kris Kobach.

Kansas House of Representatives
Preceded by Jene Vickrey	Member of the Kansas House of Representatives for the 6th District; July 27, 2020 - January 11, 2021	Succeeded by Samantha Poetter
