= Denis Blackmore =

American mathematician (1943–2022)

Denis L. Blackmore
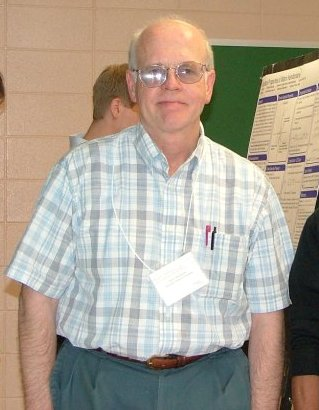
- Born: 20 July 1943
- Died: 24 April 2022 (aged 78); Maplewood, NJ, USA
- Education: NYU-Poly
- Known for: Dynamical Systems
- Scientific career
- Fields: Applied mathematics Dynamical Systems; Differential Topology
- Workplaces: New Jersey Institute of Technology (NJIT)

Denis Louis Blackmore (20 July 1943 – 24 April 2022) was an American mathematician and a full professor of the Department of Mathematical Sciences at New Jersey Institute of Technology. He was also one of the founding members of the Center for Applied Mathematics and Statistics at NJIT. Dr. Blackmore was mainly known for his many contributions in the fields of dynamical systems and differential topology. In addition to this, he had many contributions in other fields of applied mathematics, physics, biology, and engineering.

== Career and recognitions ==
Dr. Blackmore received a BS in Aerospace Engineering from the Polytechnic University in Brooklyn (now NYU-Poly). From the same institution he received his MS and PhD in Mathematics in 1966 and 1971 respectively.

His research as a senior undergraduate and graduate student was in the areas of boundary layer theory in fluid mechanics and the qualitative theory of ordinary differential equations. He was a Visiting Professor of Mathematics at the Courant Institute of Mathematical Sciences during the 1989–90 academic year.

In recognition for his work in differential equations and dynamical systems, Dr. Blackmore was invited in 1988 to give a series of lectures at the Institute of Mathematics, Academia Sinica, Beijing, China and several universities in X´ian and Guangzhou. Recently, he was invited back to China to lecture on dynamical systems at the Nankei Institute, and has been invited to work with dynamical systems experts (including Mel´nikov and Prykarpatsky) in Russia and Ukraine.

Dr. Blackmore organized the 834th Meeting of the American Mathematical Society held at NJIT in April, 1987. He has also organized numerous seminars and colloquia in the mathematical sciences, and served on the organizing committee of the 1992 Japan-USA Symposium on Flexible Automation. Recently, he organized a minisymposium on ´´Integrable Dynamical Systems and Their Applications´´ for the 1995 International Congress on Industrial and Applied Mathematics in Hamburg, Germany. Blackmore was a member of the National Honor Societies Sigma Xi and Tau Beta Pi, and was awarded the Harlan Perlis Research Award from NJIT in 1993.

Dr. Blackmore served as the president of the Faculty Senate during the COVID-19 pandemic.

== Selected publications ==
=== Papers ===
- A. Rahman; D. Blackmore (2023). "The One-dimensional Version of Peixoto's Structural Stability Theorem: A Calculus-based Proof". SIAM Review. 65 (3): 867–886. arXiv:2302.04941. doi:10.1137/21M1426572.
- D. Blackmore; Y. Prykarpatsky; M.M. Prytula; D. Dutykh; A. K. Prykarpatski (2022). "On the integrability of a new generalized Gurevich-Zybin dynamical system in Hunter-Saxton type reduction and related mysterious symmetries". Analysis and Mathematical Physics. 12 (2): 1–26. Bibcode:2022AnMP...12...66B. doi:10.1007/s13324-022-00662-0. S2CID 247879659.
- I. Benouaquef; N. Musunuri; E.C. Amah; D. L. Blackmore; I. S. Fischer; P. Singh (2021). "Solutocapillary Maragoni flow induced in a waterbody by a solute source". Journal of Fluid Mechanics. 922.
- A. Rahman; D. Blackmore (2020). "Walking droplets through the lens of dynamical systems". Modern Physics Letters B. 34 (34): 2030009. arXiv:2011.08796. Bibcode:2020MPLB...3430009R. doi:10.1142/S0217984920300094. S2CID 226975686.
- Aminur Rahman; Ian Jordan; Denis L. Blackmore (2018). "Qualitative models and experimental investigation of chaotic NOR gates and set/reset flip-flops". Proceedings of the Royal Society A. 474 (2209) 20170111. arXiv:1702.04838. Bibcode:2018RSPSA.47470111R. doi:10.1098/rspa.2017.0111. PMC 5806008. PMID 29434498.
- Denis L. Blackmore; A. D. Rosato; S. Sen; H. Wu (2017). "Simulation, modeling and dynamical analysis of multibody flows". International Journal of Modern Physics B. 31 (10): 1742004–1742911. Bibcode:2017IJMPB..3142004B. doi:10.1142/S0217979217420048.
- Denis L. Blackmore; A. D. Rosato; X. Tricoche; K. Urban; L. Zuo (2014). "Analysis, simulation, visualization of 1D tapping via reduced dynamical systems models". Physica D. 273–74: 14–27.
- D. Blackmore (2005). "New models for chaotic dynamics". Regular and Chaotic Dynamics. 10 (3): 307–321. doi:10.1070/RD2005v010n03ABEH000317.
- Denis L. Blackmore; C. Wang (2003). "Morse index for autonomous linear Hamiltonian systems". International Journal of Differential Equations and Applications. 7: 295–309.
- Denis L. Blackmore; Ya V. Mykytiuk; A. Prykarpatsky (2003). "The Lax solution to a Hamilton–Jacobi equation and its generalizations: Part 2". Nonlinear Analysis. 55 (5): 629–640. doi:10.1016/j.na.2003.08.004.
- Denis L. Blackmore; N. Aboobaker; J. Meegoda (2003). "Fractionation and segregation of suspended particles using acoustic and flow fields". Journal of Environmental Engineering. 129 (5): 427–434. doi:10.1061/(ASCE)0733-9372(2003)129:5(427). S2CID 96412843.
- A. D. Rosato; Denis L. Blackmore; N. Zhang; Y.Lan (2002). "A perspective on vibration-induced size segregation of granular materials". Chemical Engineering Science. 57 (2): 265–275. Bibcode:2002ChEnS..57..265R. doi:10.1016/S0009-2509(01)00380-3.
- Denis L. Blackmore; J. Chen (2002). "On the exponentially self-regulating population model". Chaos, Solitons and Fractals. 14 (9): 1433–1450. Bibcode:2002CSF....14.1433C. doi:10.1016/S0960-0779(02)00074-7.
- Denis L. Blackmore; J. Chen; J. Perez; M. Savescu (2001). "Dynamical properties of discrete Lotka–Volterra equations". Chaos, Solitons and Fractals. 12 (13): 2553–2568. Bibcode:2001CSF....12.2553B. doi:10.1016/S0960-0779(00)00214-9.

=== YouTube videos ===
- Dennis Blackmore – NJIT Professor of Mathematical Sciences
- Equations of Pi
