= HMS Blackmore =

Two ships of the Royal Navy have been named HMS Blackmore, named after Blackmore, Essex:

- The first HMS Blackmorevale (1917), launched in 1917 was a minesweeper that served in World War I.
- The second HMS Blackmore (L43), was a Hunt-class destroyer that served in World War II and was sold to the Royal Danish Navy in 1958.
