= Thomas Blakemore =

American lawyer

Thomas Lester Blakemore (August 26, 1915 – February 19, 1994) was an American lawyer who practiced in Tokyo, Japan for four decades following World War II.

He was born in Sapulpa, Oklahoma and earned a law degree from the University of Oklahoma in 1938. He studied law on a postgraduate level at Cambridge University and Tokyo Imperial University. During World War II, he became a captain in the United States Navy, and served with the Office of Strategic Services in China.Following the war, he served as a legal officer under General Douglas MacArthur in the Office of the Supreme Commander for the Allied Powers, where he worked on the revision of Japanese pre-war statutes. He passed the Japanese bar examination in 1949 and became a Japanese attorney at law in 1950. He co-founded the law firm of Blakemore & Mitsuki, which became a preeminent commercial law firm in Tokyo, advising many major corporations. He was decorated with the Order of the Sacred Treasure, Third Class in 1987.

Blakemore and his wife, the artist Frances Blakemore, established the Blakemore Foundation in 1990, which grants scholarships for the study of East and Southeast Asian languages to American citizens and permanent residents.

He died of heart failure in Seattle, Washington.
