= George Blackmore =

English cricketer

George Patrick Maxwell Blackmore (8 October 1908 – 29 January 1984) was an English cricketer who played in three first-class cricket matches in India and England. He was a right-handed batsman and a right-arm medium-fast bowler who was born in Gillingham, Kent. Blackmore was educated Blundell's School and died in Isleworth in Middlesex in 1984 aged 75.

Blackmore played one first-class match in India for the Europeans cricket team in the Bombay Pentangular Tournament of 1944/45, scoring eight runs in his only innings. He played a single Minor Counties Championship match for Kent County Cricket Club over three and a half years later, in 1948, followed by two appearances in the County Championship later in the same season at the age of 39. In the two innings in which he batted, he scored only four runs and took two wickets.
