= A. F. Blakemore =

A.F. Blakemore & Son Ltd
- Type: Private
- Industry: Wholesale; Retail
- Founded: 1917; 109 years ago
- Headquarters: Willenhall, UK
- Number of locations: 250
- Key people: Carol Welch (CEO)
- Number of employees: 5,500
- Website: afblakemore.com

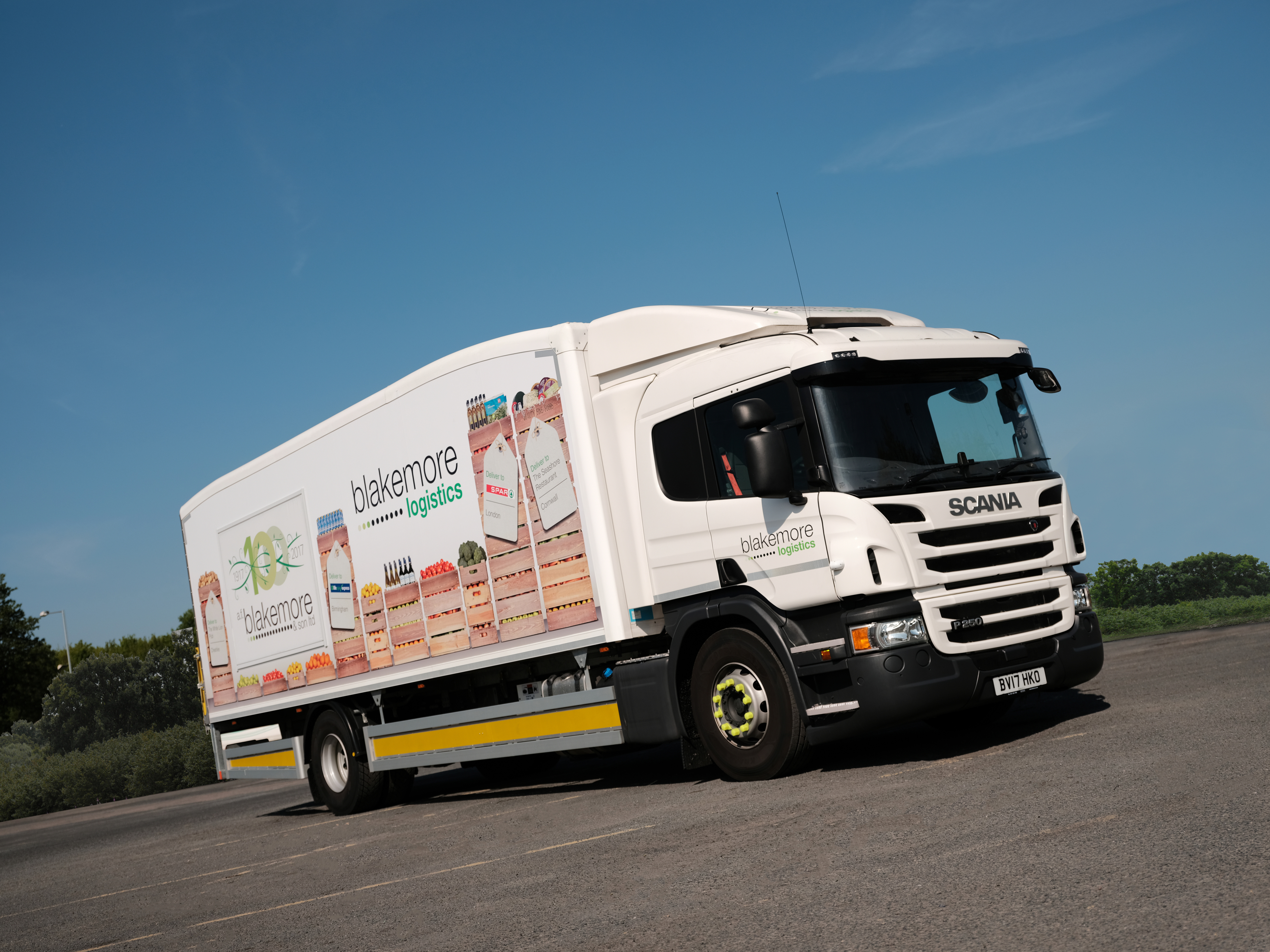
A.F. Blakemore distribution truck

A.F. Blakemore & Son Ltd is a British food retail, wholesale, and distribution company, established in 1917. It is the largest distribution center in the UK for local retailer SPAR, a licensed franchise of Dutch company Spar International. The company's headquarters are in Willenhall, West Midlands, in the United Kingdom.

== History ==
A.F. Blakemore & Son Ltd was started in 1917 as a counter service grocery store by Arthur Blakemore and his wife. After early success, they branched into supplying other groceries, at first bags and other provisions, later with products for resale.

Arthur Blakemore was followed by his son, Frank, who in turn was followed by his son, Peter Blakemore. The company is still owned by the family.

A.F. Blakemore & Son Ltd was one of the first companies involved in symbol group trading in the 1950s.

== Operations ==
A.F. Blakemore & Son Ltd is divided into several subsidiaries with different emphases and goals. These include:

- Blakemore Retail, which owns and operates 260+ SPAR stores.
- Blakemore Trade Partners, which supports A.F. Blakemore's independent SPAR estate.
- Blakemore Wholesale Distribution, which provides retailers, vending operators and wholesalers with bespoke distribution solutions.
- Blakemore Foodservice, which delivers catering products to schools, local authorities, public houses and restaurant chains.
- Blakemore Fresh Foods, which is a meat trading, wholesaling and manufacturing operation that supplies the retail, food service and wholesale sectors.
- Blakemore Design and Shopfitting, which specialises in the design and refurbishment of SPAR retail stores.
- Blakemore Property, which deals with company site acquisitions and leasings.
