= Tadashi Nakayama (artist) =

Japanese artist (1927–2014)

Tadashi Nakayama (中山 正, Nakayama Tadashi; born 1927 Niigata, Niigata, died 2014) was a Japanese woodblock print artist, working in a style that combines influences from traditional Japanese ukiyo-e prints and Western painting.

== Life and career ==
Nakayama was born in 1927. At the age of fourteen he began painting in oils and practising sketching and drawing, teaching himself entirely and slowly developing his own approach to art. He studied oil painting at Tama Art College but left in 1947.

He enrolled at Tama Art University in 1945, where he met his future wife, who joined the following year; accustomed to working alone, he left after only two years to experiment with and develop his own art independently. In 1951 he made his first colour woodblock print, and in 1953 he began working in lithography, which he abandoned in 1957 in favour of woodblock printing, the medium that would bring him international fame, though he later taught lithography with great success at Tama Art University. Prints from this period show little interest in exploring new motifs, largely confining themselves to precise observation of nature; as his interest in new artistic ideas grew, his motifs were increasingly reduced to more or less abstract forms.

From 1962 to 1965 he lived in Milan, Italy and then England.

His travels had begun in 1962, taking him to India, Turkey and Greece, where Byzantine art made a lasting impression on him; he continued travelling before settling in Milan, London and finally Bath. During this period he also discovered an enthusiasm for Renaissance art, particularly the paintings of Paolo Uccello and the prints of Pierre Bonnard, and during a stay in Paris he encountered Persian and Byzantine art anew, whose miniatures would give fresh impetus to his own prints. Inspired by Uccello's work as well as by Indian and Persian miniature painting, Nakayama began producing prints of horses, birds and female figures; over his career he explored the image of the horse through light, texture and ornamentation with increasing complexity, and with most of his woodblocks built from more than fifty overlapping impressions, his horses seem to burst from the paper as each detail draws the viewer further into the image.

He taught at Bath Academy of Arts. Motifs in his work include butterflies, horses, cranes, and girls with long flowing hair. Some of his later pieces were inspired by

His prints from 1956 to 1964 have a flat expressive simplicity, with birds, flowers, horses, butterflies and occasional architectural elements among his favoured subjects of this early period; dull, opaque colour set against richer tones creates a mystical atmosphere that gives this early work its distinctive character. A brief transitional period between 1965 and 1968, probably prompted by his travels, saw him use gold and silver alongside only powerful, bright colours with heavy earthy tones; the layering of motifs suggests a space that is difficult to grasp, though his interest in horses persisted, becoming a setting for ornamental motifs and details. In 1970, back in Japan, Nakayama moved from Tokyo to Ninaso, in the mountainous Nagano Prefecture near Karuizawa, into a house built in Western style; amid nature he created an ideal working and living situation, where he continued to refine his artistic style. The two decades that followed are considered both the high point of his stylistic development and his most productive period, with movement, compositional clarity and spatial arrangement becoming central themes in work of unsurpassed technical complexity: while the beauty of the images draws on Persian, Byzantine and Renaissance works, with their stylised motifs and richly detailed surface design, the spatial composition instead draws on the stage-like spatial structures found in early Italian Renaissance painting. In his final years, until 2014, his work slowly came to fruition: Nakayama, developing an even more complex creative process, composed almost exclusively scenes with horses, achieving clarity as well as colourful brilliance and harmony, while working carefully on the surface layers of his pieces to bring balance between life and stillness.

His catalogue raisonné is Tadashi Nakayama: His Life and Work, by Kappy Hendricks and Marshall Hendricks.

His work is held in several museums, including the Asian Art Museum in San Francisco, the Minneapolis Institute of Art, the Los Angeles County Museum of Art, the Santa Barbara Museum of Art, the National Museum of Asian Art, the Carnegie Museum of Art, the Seattle Art Museum, the University of Michigan Museum of Art, the Brooklyn Museum, the Portland Art Museum, the Indianapolis Museum of Art, the Fine Arts Museum of San Francisco, the Harvard Art Museums, and the Honolulu Museum of Art.
