= Peter Blackmore (footballer) =

English footballer (1879–1937)

Personal information
- Full name: Peter Blackmore
- Date of birth: 1879
- Place of birth: Gorton, Manchester, England
- Date of death: 1937 (aged 57–58)
- Position: Centre-forward

Youth career
- Ross Place Old Boys

Senior career*
| Years | Team | Apps | (Gls) |
| 1899 | Newton Heath | 2 | (0) |
- * Club domestic league appearances and goals

Peter Blackmore (1879–1937) was an English footballer who played as a forward. Born in Gorton, Manchester, he played for Newton Heath, making one appearance in The Football League and one in the FA Cup.
