= Telescope (goldfish) =

Common name of fancy goldfish characterised by its protruding eyes

Telescope goldfish
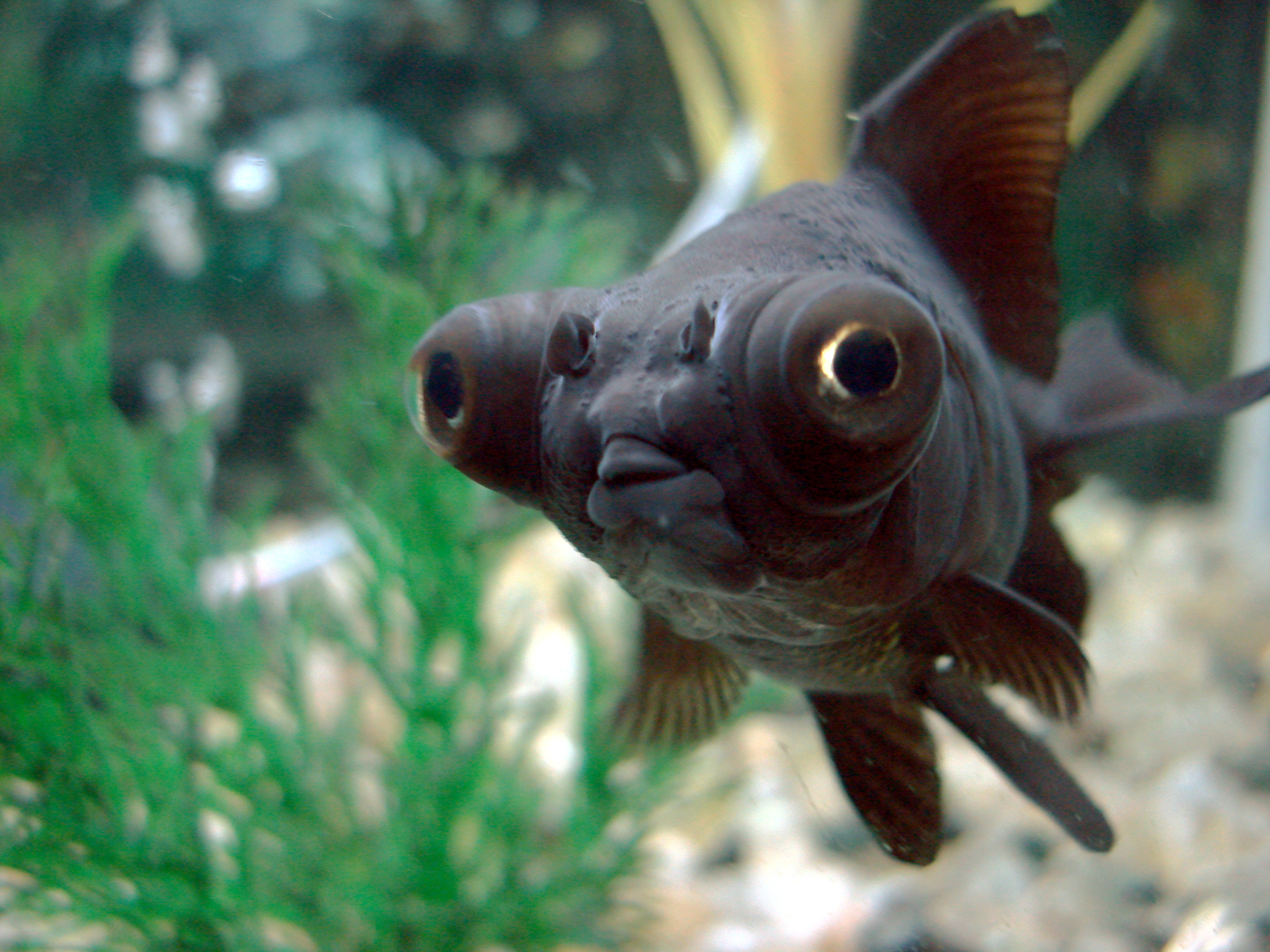
- Country of origin: China
- Type: Fantailed

Classification
- BAS

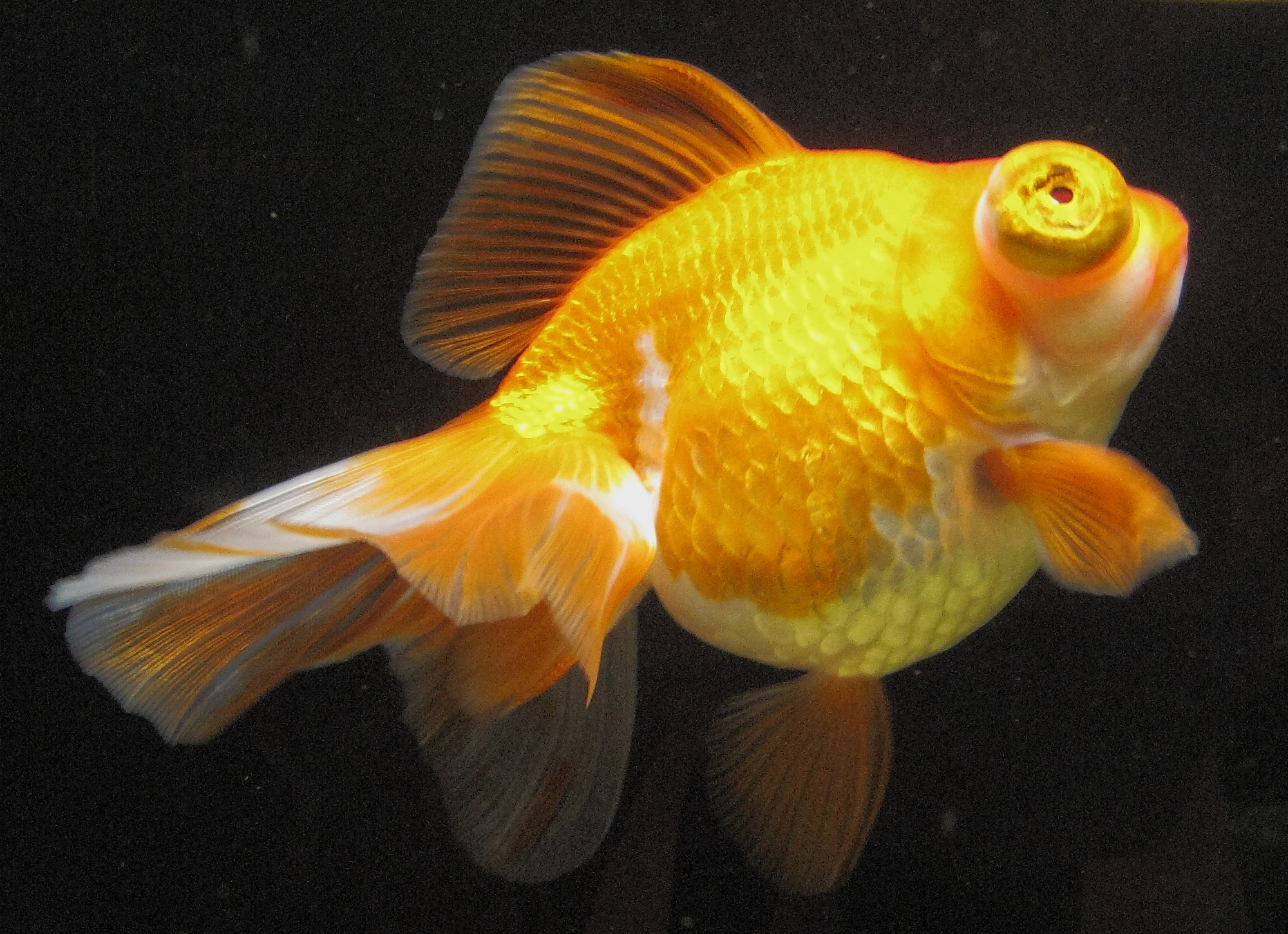
An orange dragoneye goldfish

The telescope, telescope goldfish or telescope eye (Chinese: 出目金; pinyin: Chū mù jīn) is a goldfish characterised by its protruding eyes. It was first developed in the early 1700s in China, where the trait was referred to as dragon eyes.

Variants are called the Black Moor and the Panda Moor.

== Description ==
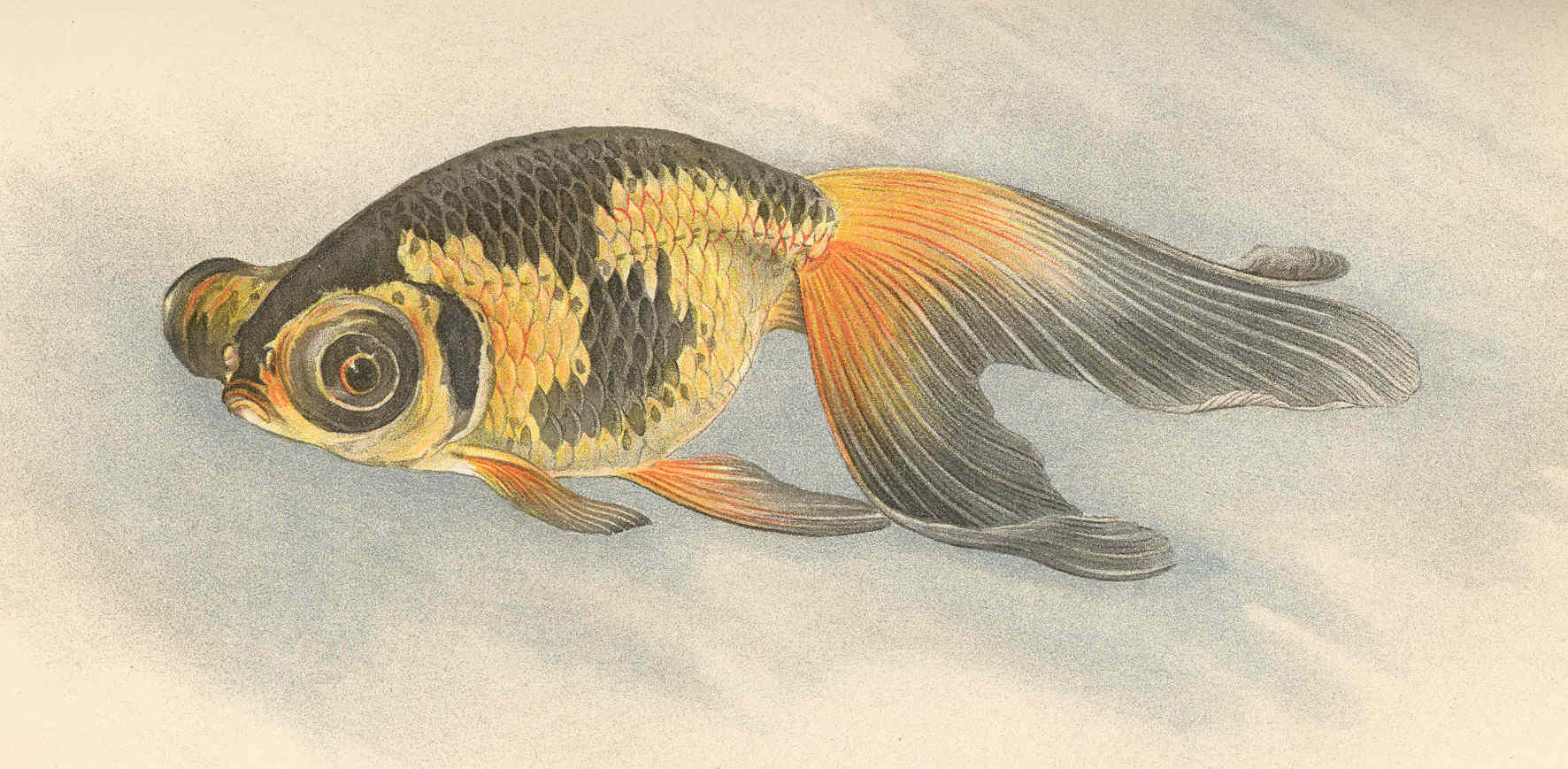
Ranchu with telescope eyes, 1910

Except for its enlarged projecting eyes, the demekin is similar to the ryukin and fantail. It has a deep body and long flowing fins, some with veiled fins and some with broad, or short fins, like the "China doll". Demekins are available in red, red-and-white, calico, black-and-white, chocolate, blue, lavender, kirin, chocolate-and-blue and black coloration. They may either have metallic, matted, or nacreous scales. The telescope eyes can grow quite large.

== Variants ==
=== Black Moor ===
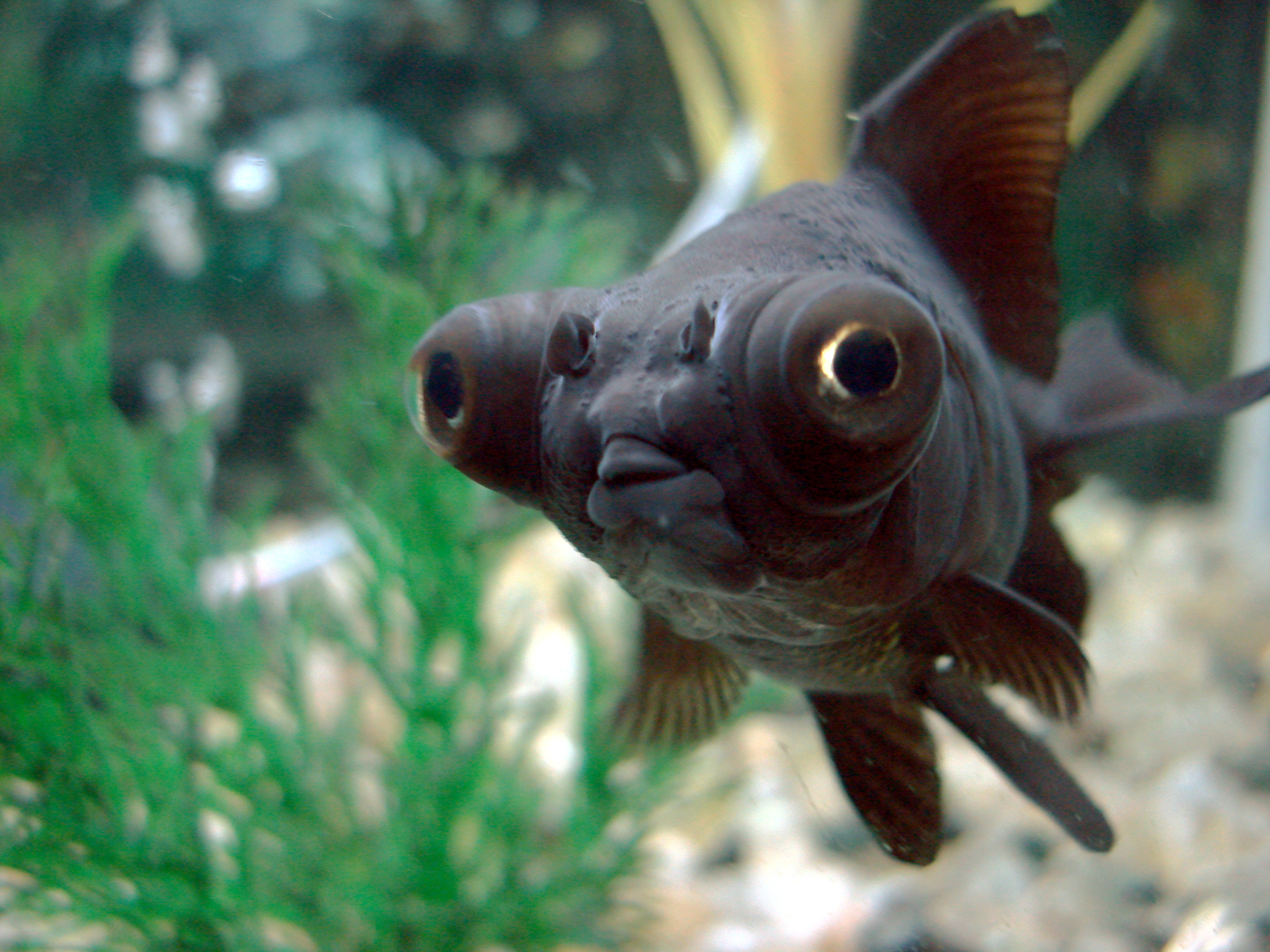
The highest quality black moors have a velvety appearance and no metallic scales.

The black moor is a black variant of the telescope goldfish that has a characteristic pair of protruding eyes. Black telescopes are commonly known as Black Moors, Blackamoors (archaic) or just Moors, a reference to the black North African Muslim inhabitants of Al-Andalus.

Black moors are believed to originate from China in the 1400s. In the 1500s they were traded in Japan, and finally, in the 1800s, they made their way to the U.S. It is widely accepted they were a result of selective fish breeding by the Chinese, who first called them Dragon Fish or Dragon Eyes.

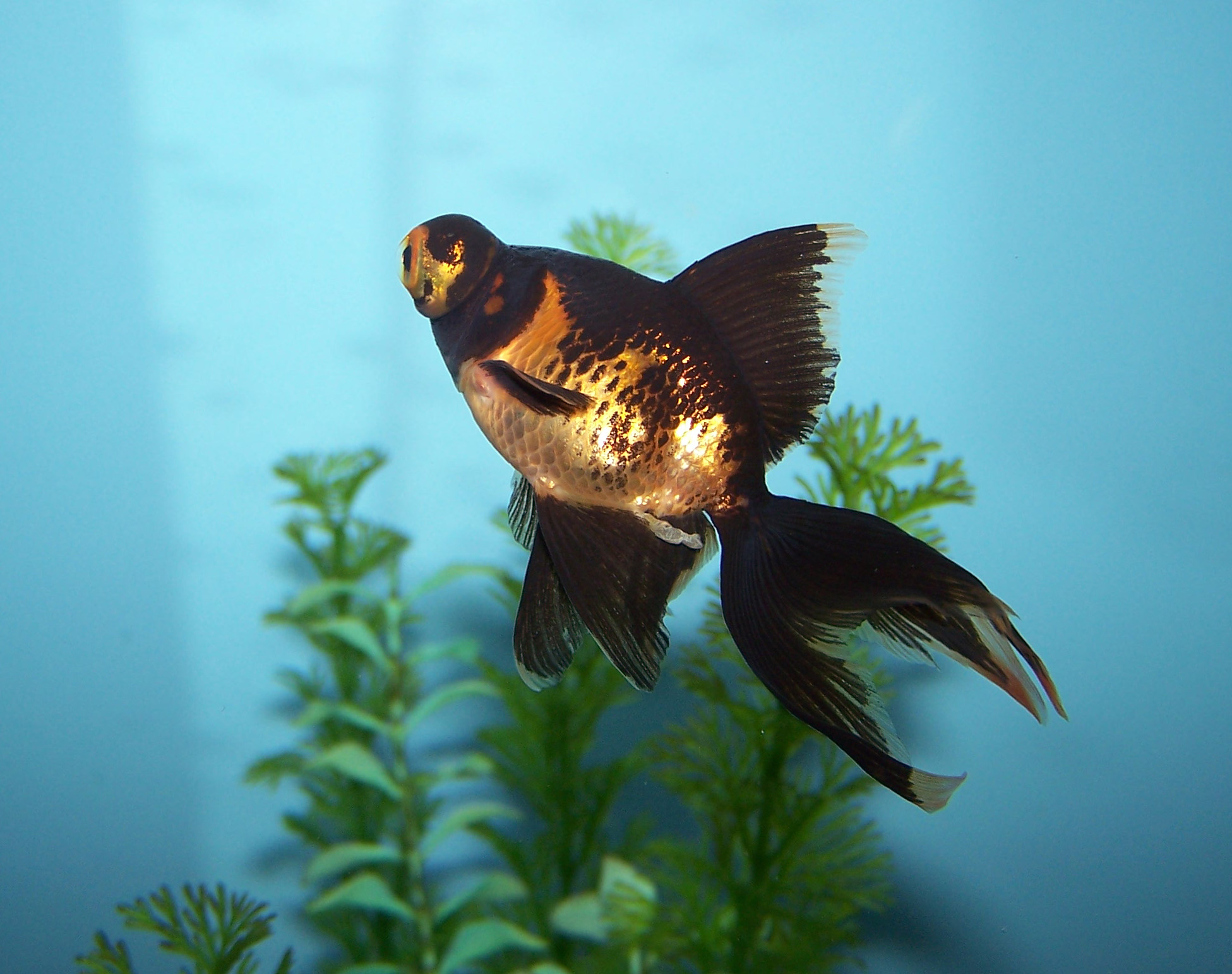
A young orange telescope losing its black pigmentation

Most telescopes have deep bodies and long, flowing finnage, with characteristic protruding eyes, but the original is fan-tailed and has a similar body to the fantail goldfish, from which they are derived.

Young black telescopes resemble bronze fantails. Their black coloration and eye protrusion develop with age. They can grow up to a length of 4-10 inches, but may lose their velvet-like appearance with increasing age (lifespan: 6 to 25 years).

Unlike juvenile telescope fish that display temporary black pigmentation, a genuine Black Moor retains its black color permanently. While young goldfish typically shift from a rust-colored underbelly to orange sploshes as they mature, true Black Moors stay a solid black color throughout their lives.

It was once theorized that the blackness in goldfish is only exhibited by the telescope-eyed goldfish and that the black color is only a permanent fixture with telescope eye goldfish. However, with the recent entry of black lionheads, black orandas, black ranchus, black ryukins, black pearlscales, black comets, black bubble eyes, black crosses of two or more goldfish, and black "hibunas", this view is no longer true.

In fact, black telescopes do sometimes spawn normal-eyed offspring, which are black also. However, they are often culled as they do not conform to the telescope eye feature for the moor variety.

Because their eyes are usually large, their vision is poor.

Black telescope goldfish are popular because they are hardy fish and because their black color sets them apart from the more abundant orange color. Goldfish are typically easy to care for, and black moors in particular are able to withstand a wide variety of temperatures. They do well with other fancy goldfish varieties, especially those with impaired vision such as the bubble eye or Celestial goldfish.

In 1941, Moscow aquarist P. Andrianov bred a kind of black telescope with orange-red eyes.

The Blackamoor goldfish is featured on a commemorative 2018 postage stamp from Mozambique.

=== Panda Telescope ===
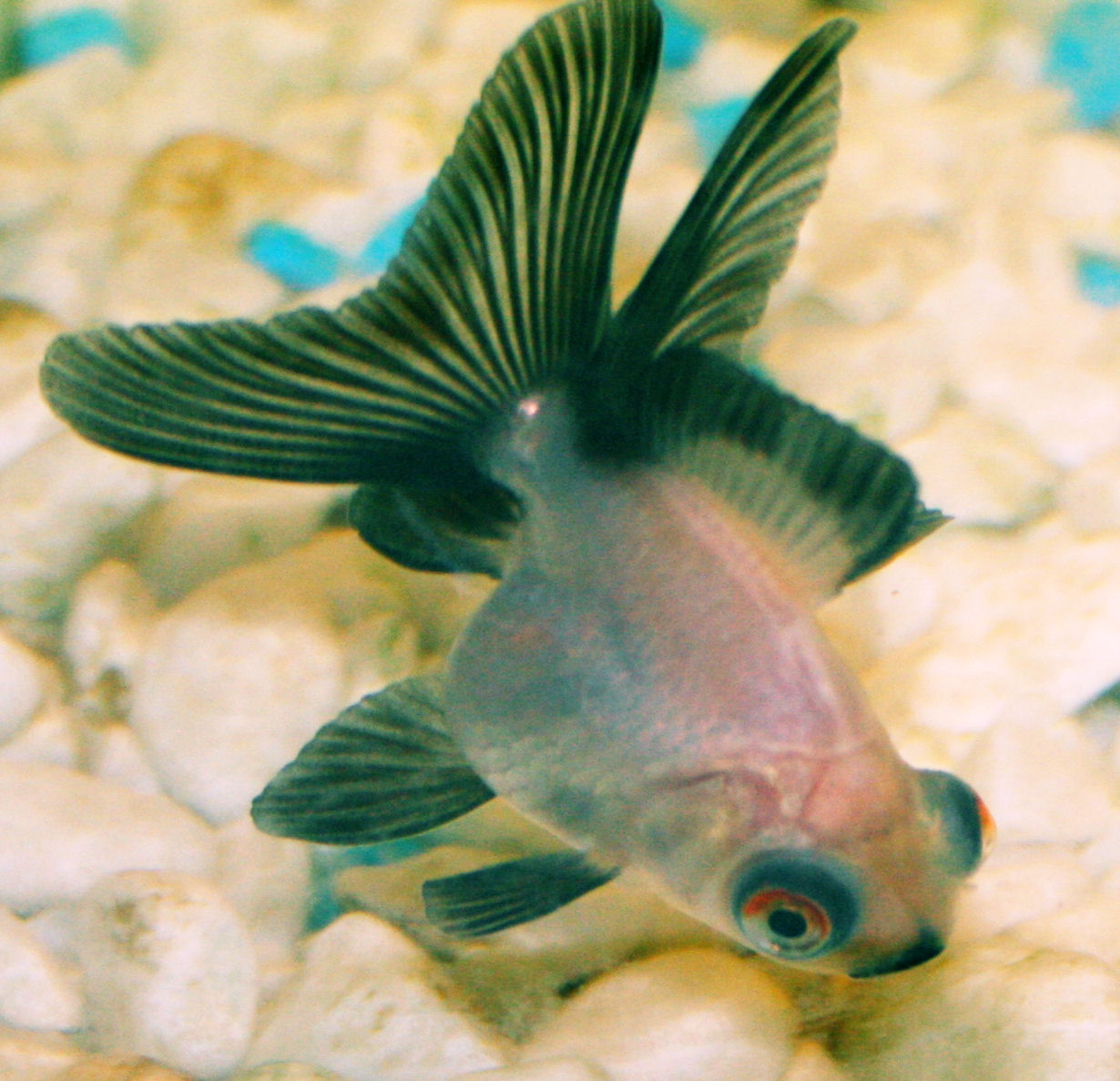
Juvenile panda moor goldfish

The panda telescope is a panda variant of a telescope goldfish with a characteristic black-and-white color pattern and protruding eyes.

Panda telescopes have protruding eyes. Young moors resemble bronze fantails and their protruding eyes gradually develop with age. They sport a velvety appearance in maturity. However, they may lose this velvet-like appearance with increasing age. They can also lose their panda coloration with age; they may become orange and white or any other color combination. Frequently panda moors will not keep any of their coloration, or they may turn pure white.

=== White Telescope ===
A white telescope goldfish

White telescope is a white variant of telescope goldfish characterized by a solid white body and protruding eyes.

The white telescope has a solid white body which contrasts with the black variant, the black telescope goldfish, which has a solid black body. The white moor is a variant of the telescope goldfish.

Young white telescopes resemble bronze fantails. Their brown coloration decreases and eye protrusion develops with age. They can grow up to a length of 6 inches. Because their eyes are usually large, their vision is poor.

White telescopes are less popular than black telescopes. The white telescopes, in particular, are able to withstand a wide variety of temperatures. They do well with other fancy goldfish varieties.

=== Other variants ===
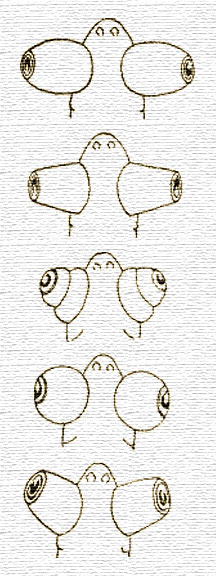
Common variations of the telescope eye

There are also red, orange and yellow telescopes.

== See also ==
- Celestial Eye
- Bubble Eye
