= Animal welfare and rights in Japan =

Treatment of and laws concerning non-human animals in Japan

Animal welfare in Japan
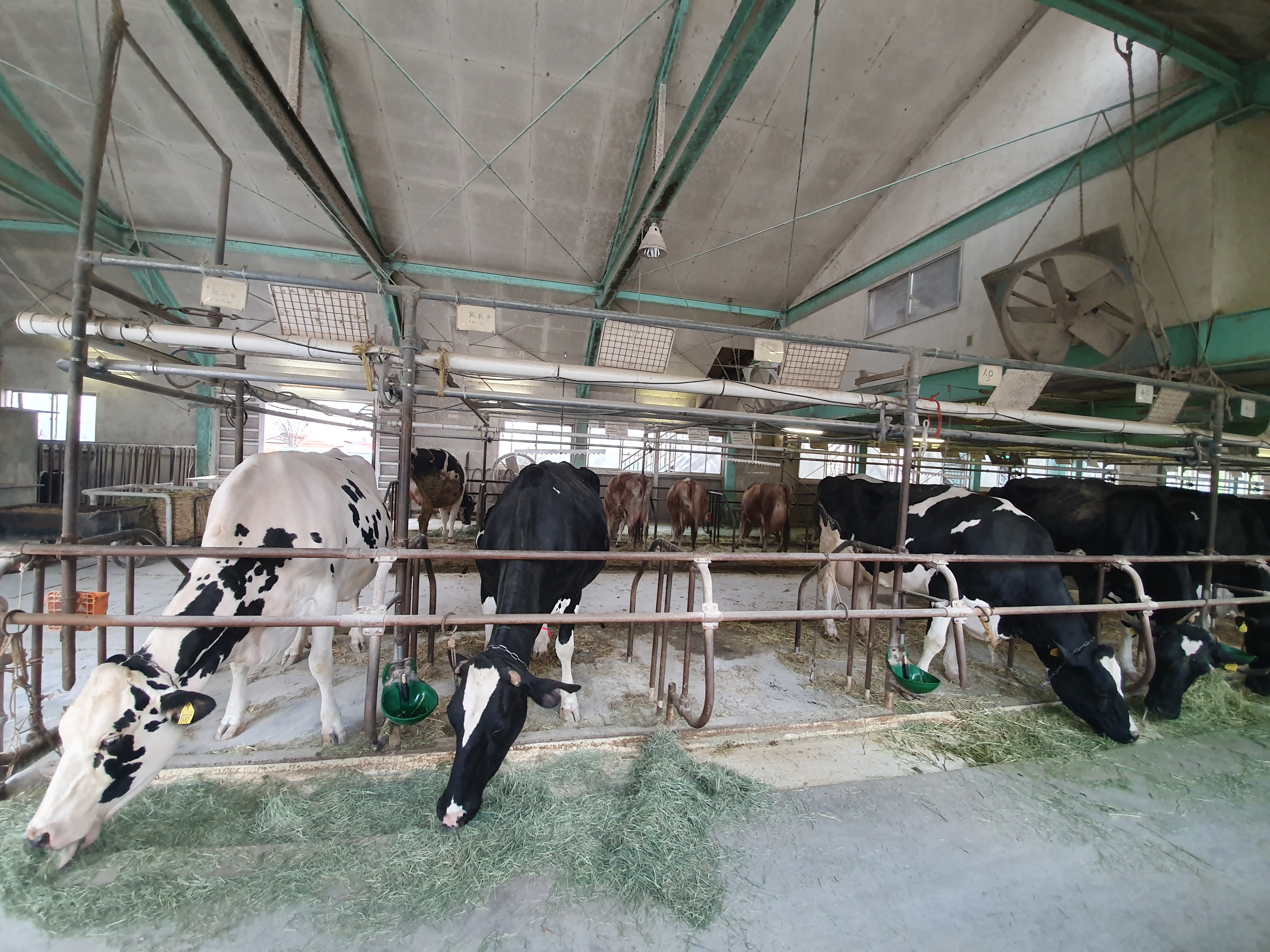
- Dairy cows in Japan
- Legislation: 1973 Act on Welfare and Management of Animals

Number of animals slaughtered annually for meat production
- Total: 839.40 million (2022)
- Per capita: 6.77 (2022)

Japan has implemented several national animal welfare laws since 1973, but these protections are considered weak by international standards. Animal activism and protection laws in Japan primarily focus on the welfare of domesticated animals and farm animals.

== History of animal product consumption ==
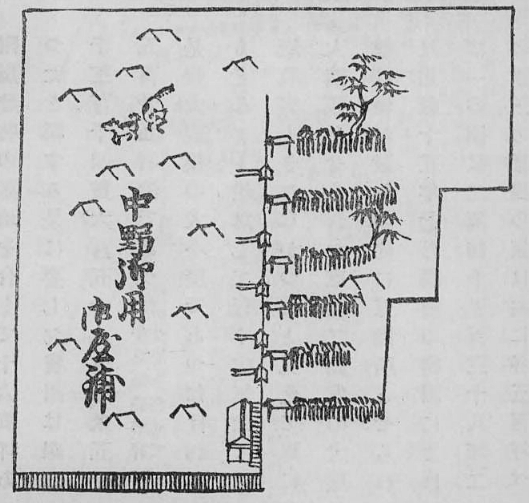
Historic drawing of the Nakano Inugoya (Nakano dog shelters) in 1696. Tokugawa Tsunayoshi had large kennels built in Nakano, Yotsuya and Okubo in Edo (Tokyo). Even during the famine the Shogunate accommodated 80,000 stray dogs in the kennels in Nakano and gave them 3 go (0.18L) of polished rice, 50 moon (187g) of bean paste and 1 go of sardines daily. The total space for the dog shelters in Nakano was approximately 750,000 square meters in 1702.

Buddhism was first introduced to Japan in the 6th century CE. A central teaching of Buddhism is ahimsa, or nonviolence towards all living beings. Buddhist teachings against killing animals and the encouragement of vegetarianism were influential during several periods of Japanese history.

In 675, Emperor Tenmu issued a ban on the consumption of meat, with exceptions for fish and wild animals, due to his devout Buddhist beliefs. However, the ban was not widely observed.

Meat consumption was reintroduced to Japan with the arrival of Christian missionaries from Portugal and the Netherlands in the 16th century, who brought with them their omnivorous diets.

In 1687, Tokugawa Tsunayoshi, the fifth shōgun of the Tokugawa dynasty, following Buddhist principles, reinstated the ban on eating meat and made killing animals illegal. This led to the development of a black market for meat obtained through hunting.

In 1872, Emperor Meiji repealed the ban on meat and began publicly eating it at dinners with Westerners. This decision faced resistance; in one notable incident, ten monks attempted to break into the Imperial Palace, claiming that foreign influence was leading many Japanese to eat meat, which they believed was destroying the soul of the Japanese people. Several monks were killed during the break-in attempt, and the others were arrested.

Since then, the consumption of animal products has become widespread in Japan, increasing dramatically with the introduction of intensive animal farming in the 1950s.

== Legislation ==
Japan's primary animal welfare legislation is the 1973 Act on Welfare and Management of Animals. This law criminalizes the killing, injuring, or infliction of cruelty on animals without due cause. It also imposes a duty of care on animal owners and keepers to ensure the health and safety of their animals, and to manage them according to their species and behavior. The law protects a variety of animals, including cattle, horses, pigs, sheep, goats, dogs, cats, domestic rabbits, chickens, domestic pigeons, and domestic ducks. It also extends protection to any other animals with an owner, with the notable exception of fish. Penalties for killing or injuring protected animals can include fines or imprisonment for up to one year, while abandonment and neglect are punishable by fines.

With the exception of fish, all farm animals are covered by the anti-cruelty and duty of care provisions. Slaughter practices are required to minimize pain and distress, but specific methods are not mandated, and stunning is not compulsory. Additionally, regulations concerning animal-handling businesses exclude livestock and do not specifically address farm animals.

For the cultural and industry-standard crediting practices in the Japanese film industry which has different, often less stringent, internal standards for such public recognition in the credits and traditionally have less detailed animal welfare documentation in the credits compared to Hollywood productions. The on-set management of animal welfare in Japanese filmed media is often an internal production matter or handled by registered animal handling businesses, rather than a publicly monitored and credited one. The responsibility ultimately rests with the producer or their representative. Similarly, animals in the Japanese film industry with very small roles used as props which might not warrant a dedicated, prominent credit in the Japanese system.

The anti-cruelty and duty of care provisions also apply to animals used in research. The law mandates that alternative methods should be considered and that the number of animals used should be minimized. Experimentation methods that reduce pain and distress are required. In 2005, the law was amended to incorporate new basic guidelines for experimentation based on the Three Rs (refine, replace, reduce) for animal testing. Despite these amendments, enforcement largely relies on self-regulation.

The 2002 Japan animal cruelty case led to a public outcry and stricter laws and enforcement.

In 2012, the law was amended to impose stricter regulations on sellers of dogs and cats, establish measures for animal welfare during disasters, clarify definitions of animal abuse, and expand the duty of care beyond individual owners. The amendment requires that "every person shall maintain the environment and health of animals, shall feed and water animals properly by taking into account their natural habits and giving consideration to the symbiosis between humans and animals."

In 2020, Japan received an E rating on the World Animal Protection Animal Protection Index, where A is the best possible score.

== Animal euthanasia ==
During Japan's period of rapid economic growth, a pet boom led to an increase in the number of households keeping dogs and cats. As a consequence, the number of dogs and cats euthanized at hokenjo [ja], public health centers operated by local governments, for various reasons reached 1,221,000 in 1974. Since then, amid a broader rise in public awareness of animal welfare in Japanese society, the number of animals euthanized has declined sharply over the following 50 years, falling to less than one-hundredth of that figure and reaching only about 9,000 as of 2023, according to statistics from the Ministry of the Environment. The decline in the number of animals euthanized is largely attributable to efforts to curb the overbreeding of dogs and cats, as well as the significant expansion of adoption initiatives and animal protection activities carried out by local governments and animal welfare organizations.

== Animal issues ==
=== Animals used for food ===
==== Animal agriculture ====
Veal crates, gestation crates, and battery cages are legal in Japan, as is the practice of cutting off tails, beaks, and fangs without anesthesia.

Beef production in Japan increased from 142,000 tons in 1960 to a peak of 602,000 tons in 1994, and then decreased to 510,000 tons in 2024. Poultry consumption rose significantly from 74,000 tons to 1,375,000 tons in 2015, representing a twenty-fold increase. In 2024, Japan produced 1.125 million cattle and 16.8 million swine. In 2010, over 823 million farm animals were slaughtered in Japan, approximately seven times the overall farm animal population.

==== Animal product consumption ====
Japanese total meat consumption increased five-fold from the 1960s to 2000.

Japan is the second largest fish and seafood importer in the world and the largest in Asia. Per capita consumption of fish and seafood declined from 40 kg in 2007 to 33 kg in 2012, partly due to a rise in meat and dairy consumption.

A 2014 survey by the Japanese organization Animal Rights Center found that 4.7% of respondents were vegetarians (including vegans).

=== Animal testing ===
A 2009 survey found a total of 11,337,334 animals being maintained in Japanese laboratories. Cruelty Free International estimates that Japan ranks second in the world (behind China) in the number of animals used in experiments, with approximately 15 million animals used annually.

Testing cosmetics on animals is both legal and mandatory in Japan. The law requires that "quasi-drugs," such as skin-lightening products, suntan lotion, and hair growth tonics, be tested on animals when new ingredients are added. Shiseido, Japan's largest cosmetics manufacturer, announced in 2013 that it would stop testing cosmetics on animals. In 2015, Humane Society International began leading a Be Cruelty-Free campaign to pressure the National Diet to ban testing cosmetics on animals.

=== Taiji dolphin drive hunt ===
The Taiji dolphin drive hunt is an annual dolphin drive hunt that takes place in Taiji, Wakayama, Japan, every year from September to March.

The hunt is performed by a select group of fishermen from the town. When a pod of dolphins is spotted, fishing boats move into position. One end of a steel pipe is lowered into the water, and the fishermen aboard the boats strike the pipe with mallets to confuse the dolphins' sonar.

The steel pipes are placed at strategic points around the pod to herd the dolphins toward the bay and a sheltered cove. Once enough dolphins have been herded into place, the fishermen quickly close off the area with nets to prevent the dolphins from escaping.

As the dolphins are initially quite agitated, they are left to calm down overnight. The following day, fishermen enter the bay in small boats, and the dolphins are caught one at a time and killed. For centuries, the primary method of dispatch was to cut the dolphins' throats. This method grew controversial as it resulted in the dolphins dying from exsanguination due to severed blood vessels.

The Japanese government banned this previous method due to excessive suffering. The officially sanctioned method now requires a metal pin to be driven into the cervical region (neck) of the dolphin to sever the brainstem. Targeting the brainstem causes death within seconds, according to a memo from Senzo Uchida, the executive secretary of the Japan Cetacean Conference on Zoological Gardens and Aquariums.

According to an academic paper published in 2013 in the Journal of Applied Animal Welfare Science titled "A Veterinary and Behavioral Analysis of Dolphin Killing Methods Currently Used in the 'Drive Hunt' in Taiji, Japan", the killing method involving driving a rod into the spine and using a pin to stop bleeding creates such terror and pain that it would be illegal to kill cows in Japan in the same manner. Several veterinarians and behavioral scientists evaluated the current Taiji dolphin killing method and concluded, "This killing method [...] would not be tolerated or permitted in any regulated slaughterhouse process in the developed world."

=== Exotic pets ===
Japan has one of the largest markets for the exotic pet trade, threatening the survival of many wild species. Exotic animal cafés, where wild animals are often kept in inappropriate conditions, are found throughout the country. Asian small-clawed otters, a species native to Southeast Asia whose international trade has been banned by CITES, are especially popular, with social media blamed for driving demand.

== Organizations ==
The Animal Rights Center works on issues related to the welfare of stray animals and opposes animal testing, fur farming, and meat consumption through demonstrations, lectures, and the distribution of educational materials.

VegeProject Japan also focuses on farmed animal issues by encouraging companies and institutions to offer plant-based options. VegeProject began as a college project to introduce vegan options at Kyoto University and has since achieved similar successes at Tokyo University, Hitotsubashi University, Nagoya University, and Kobe University, among others. The organization has expanded to collaborate with companies through its vegan certification program, including with well-known brands such as Kikkoman, Kagome, Nippn, Marukome, and Marusanai. According to their website, VegeProject's goal is to create a society where vegan options are widely accessible.

Animal Welfare Japan (AWJ) traces its origins to an organization founded in Tokyo in 1945 by British expatriates. Its initial aim was to improve the welfare of dogs used in experiments, who were kept in poor conditions and subjected to unregulated in vivo tests. Officially established in the United Kingdom, AWJ continued to support efforts to aid these dogs and other animals, eventually founding a AWJ branch in Japan. Its current activities include funding vital animal welfare equipment, such as veterinary drugs and humane cat traps, providing general funds for local animal welfare groups, and promoting the Five Freedoms for Japanese animals.

According to Honjo (2014), Japanese animal welfare organizations primarily focus on companion animals and tend to pay less attention to farmed animals.

== See also ==
- Whaling in Japan
- Pet culture in Japan
- Timeline of animal welfare and rights
- History of vegetarianism
- Animal rights movement
- Animal protectionism
- 2002 Japan animal cruelty case
