= Kogenta =

Kogenta may refer to:

- Byakko no Kogenta (Kogenta of the white tiger) a character in Onmyō Taisenki
- Kogenta (post-mortem name), the cat that was the victim of the 2002 Japan animal cruelty case
