= Marusan =

Marusan may refer to:

- Marusan Shōten, a Japanese toy company established in 1947.
- Marusan-Ai, a Japanese miso and soy milk company in 1952.
- The 3rd Naval Armaments Supplement Programme, nicknamed Maru 3(San) Keikaku.
