= Heracross =

Pokémon species

- Pokémon character
- Heracross artwork by Ken Sugimori
- First game: Pokémon Gold and Silver (1999)
- Designed by: Ken Sugimori (finalized)
- Voiced by: List: Katsuyuki Konishi (1999–2022) Yuji Ueda (2021–present) Koichi Sakaguchi (Pokémon: Advanced Battle) Shinnosuke Ogami (Pokémon the Movie: The Power of Us)

In-universe information
- Species: Pokémon
- Type: Bug and Fighting

Heracross (/ˈhɛrəkrɒs/), known in Japan as Heracros (Japanese: ヘラクロス, Hepburn: Herakurosu), is a Pokémon species in Nintendo and Game Freak's Pokémon media franchise, first introduced in the 1999 video games Pokémon Gold and Silver and designed by Ken Sugimori. Since Heracross's debut, it has appeared in multiple games including Pokémon Go and the Pokémon Trading Card Game, as well as in various forms of merchandise.

Resembling a blue Japanese rhinoceros beetle with a prolonged horn on its forehead, Heracross is classified as a Bug- and Fighting-type Pokémon. In the franchise's fictional universe, Heracross is strong enough to topple trees, but is typically docile. The species also has a rivalry with the Pokémon Pinsir. Heracross have been owned by multiple characters in both the games and Pokémon: The Series, including by anime protagonist Ash Ketchum; Heracross has been primarily voiced by Katsuyuki Konishi and Yuji Ueda in the series. An additional form of Heracross, dubbed Mega Heracross, was introduced in the 2013 video game Pokémon X and Y.

Following its debut, Heracross received positive reception for both its design and competitive abilities, consistently being recommended for use during playthroughs. It was also noted for its reflection of real-world insect fighting. A Heracross named "Bois" in Pokémon Legends: Z-A received additional praise from critics and fans, causing the creation of memes and appreciation posts in the community.

== Conception and development ==
Heracross is a species of fictional creatures called Pokémon created for the Pokémon media franchise. Developed by Game Freak and published by Nintendo, the Japanese franchise began in 1996 with the video games Pokémon Red and Green for the Game Boy, which were later released in North America as Pokémon Red and Blue in 1998. In these games and their sequels, the player assumes the role of a Trainer whose goal is to capture and use the creatures' special abilities to combat other Pokémon. Some Pokémon can transform into stronger species through a process called evolution via various means, such as exposure to specific items. Each Pokémon has one or two elemental types, which define its advantages and disadvantages when battling other Pokémon. A major goal in each game is to complete the Pokédex, a comprehensive Pokémon encyclopedia, by capturing, evolving, and trading with other Trainers to obtain individuals from all Pokémon species.

Heracross was first introduced in Pokémon Gold and Silver. When developing the games, around 300 individual Pokémon designs were drafted by various development team members, with each deciding their names and features and revising the drafts as needed. During this process, the team actively tried to avoid vague design concepts, as they felt this had caused difficulty creating completed Pokémon during the development of Red and Blue. As the team selected which Pokémon would be included, they were drawn and finalized by lead artist Ken Sugimori. To maintain balance, however, many of the newer species did not appear in the early stages of the game. Additionally, many of the Pokémon were designed with merchandise in mind, taking into account the related Pokémon toy line and anime series. As a result designs often had to be kept simplistic, something that caused strain for Sugimori and affected his approach to the next Pokémon franchise titles, Pokémon Ruby and Sapphire.

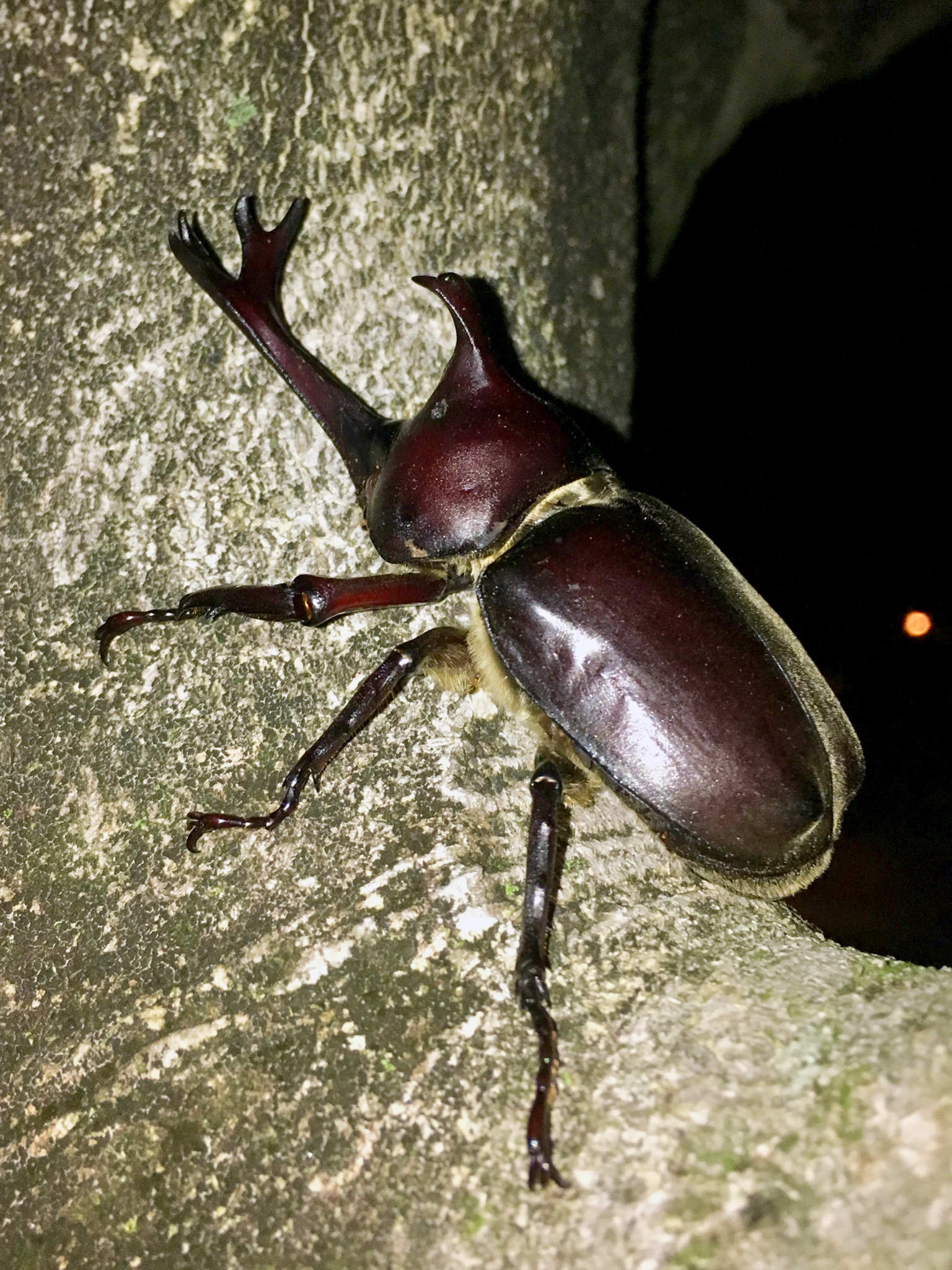
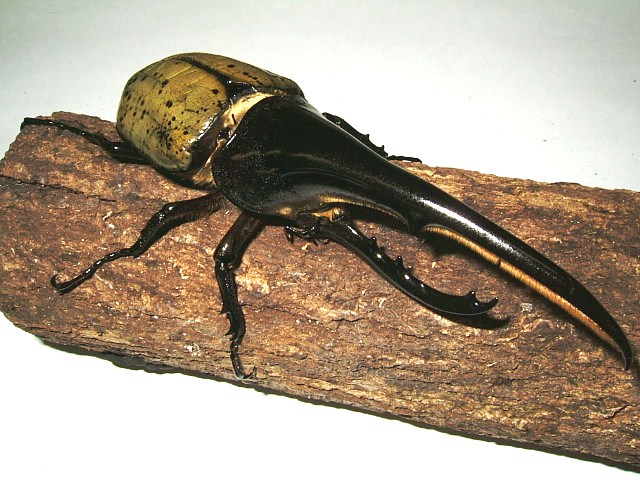
Heracross and its Mega form are believed to be based on the Japanese rhinoceros beetle (left) and the hercules beetle respectively (right)

Heracross is known as the Single Horn Pokémon; it is a large bipedal beetle-like Pokémon with a blue exoskeleton. It is typically smiling, a long horn on its forehead with two antenna either side of it, and yellow eyes. Depending on its gender, its horn is capped with a different structure; a cross-shape for males and a heart-shape for females. Underneath its exoskeleton are a set of wings. Its shiny form changes its color to bright pink. Heracross can range from being docile to toppling over trees, depending on its mood and behavior. It also likes to consume tree sap, using its horn to hoard it. Heracross has been shown to have different relationships between certain Pokémon. Heracross is observed to have a commensal relationship with the Pokémon Butterfree, whereas it has rivalry with another beetle-like Pokémon Pinsir, which it has been seen battling in games like New Pokémon Snap. In the code of a leaked build of a Gold and Silver demo from Nintendo Space World 1997, a scrapped evolution of Pinsir was found called Plucks or Plux, which featured design elements similar to Heracross. Both fans and journalists speculate that the former was reworked into the latter, with some pointing to the fact that Heracross was not present within the demo as evidence of the theory. Within another leaked build from later on in development, a scratchpad image was found containing an earlier design of Heracross featuring a vertical mouth similar to Pinsir. Many Pokémon of the second generation's region, Johto, were designed with a rural Japanese influence due to a significant amount of species being based on animals known to live in "temperate forest environment." Heracross's design likely originates from the order of Coleoptera, most likely the Japanese rhinoceros beetle (Allomyrina dichotoma). Heracross's name is a combination of "hercules beetle" and "cross", as well as stemming from the Greek mythological hero Heracles, later adapted by the Romans as Hercules.

The 2013 game Pokémon X and Y introduced a temporary, in-battle transformation for Heracross known as Mega Heracross. Its design features red accents, claw-like hands and a longer horn. Mega Heracross is more strongly based on the hercules beetle.

== Appearances ==
Artwork of Mega Heracross. National Geographic described its design as being influenced by the Hercules beetle.

Heracross first appeared in the 1999 video game Pokémon Gold and Silver; it is classified as a Bug- and Fighting-type Pokémon with only one stage, meaning it has no pre-evolutions and is not known to evolve. In Pokémon X and Y, Heracross received a new form called Mega Heracross, obtainable by using a Heracronite Mega Stone. The Mega form would go on to appear in Pokémon Omega Ruby and Alpha Sapphire, Sun and Moon, Ultra Sun and Ultra Moon, and Legends: Z-A. Depending on the game, Heracross can only be caught through different circumstances. In Gold and Silver, as well as the enhanced version Pokémon Crystal, it could only be encountered by having a Pokémon use the move Headbutt on trees on specific routes. In Pokémon Diamond and Pearl, if a player uses the Sweet Honey item on certain colored trees, Heracross have a chance to appear from it. In other games in the series, Heracross are rarer to encounter, only being available on specific routes or areas that feature rare Pokémon such as the Safari Zone in the third generation games, or only available in a post-game area like in Pokémon Ultra Sun and Ultra Moon. In Pokémon Sun and Moon, they can only be obtained by trading. Heracross has occasionally been a version exclusive, meaning one would need to be trade to be seen in the opposite version; a naturally obtainable Heracross can only be found in Pokémon Y and Pokémon Shield. It was initially absent from Pokémon Sword and Shield until being added in the Isle of Armor DLC expansion pack. In Pokémon Legends: Z-A, the player can receive a Heracross named "Bois" from trading with an NPC during an early game tutorial mission. Heracross has been used by many characters across multiple entries in the series, such as by the player's rival Blue in his champion match in Pokémon FireRed and LeafGreen, rival Barry and Elite Four member Aaron in Pokémon Diamond and Pearl, Platinum and their respective remakes, and Commander Kamado in Pokémon Legends: Arceus.

Heracross can be seen in other spin-off Pokémon video games, including Pokémon Stadium 2, the Pokémon Mystery Dungeon series, Pokémon Rumble World, Pokémon Shuffle, Pokémon Duel, Pokémon Masters EX, and Pokémon Sleep. A Heracross can appear during the night version of the Florio Nature Park level of New Pokémon Snap; the player can interact with the Heracross and cause it to react to and fight a Pinsir in order to complete in-game requests. In Pokémon Go, Heracross is only able to be caught in regions of South America, Central America, Mexico, southern Florida and Texas. It has occasionally been made available internationally, such as during an event that promoted Mega Heracross in Raid Battles. Heracross was used for a promotional event for GO in August 2018, where The Pokémon Company president Tsunekazu Ishihara traded the Pokémon to Japanese actor Takeru Satoh. It and its Mega form have made multiple appearances in the Pokémon Trading Card Game, including in a Japan-exclusive set meant to promote the recent instalments in the Pokémon movies series. A Heracross card would later appear in the mobile game Pokémon Trading Card Game Pocket. In the Super Smash Bros. series, Heracross has been obtainable in multiple titles as a collectable; in Melee it appeared as a trophy, and in Ultimate it appeared as a "spirit".

In Pokémon: The Series's third season, Pokémon: The Johto Journeys, protagonist Ash Ketchum catches a Heracross in the episode "A Sappy Ending" after it defeated Team Rocket, in which it becomes an infrequent member of his team throughout his time in the Johto region. It would appear on Ash's team in the Johto League, where it would defeat his rival Gary Oak's Magmar. Ash would eventually send Heracross to go live at Professor Oak's lab. It would subsequently re-appear in further eras of the series, such as Battle Frontier and Sinnoh League, where in the latter Heracross would be defeated by Sinnoh League competitor Tobias's Darkrai. Another Heracross would appear in Pokémon Journeys: The Series; Ash's friend Goh trades his second Pinsir for a Heracross owned by the Bug-type trainer Kricketina Kylie (known in Japanese as Korotock Koromi), after his first Pinsir fell in love with the Heracross. Until 2022, Heracross was voiced by Japanese voice actor Katsuyuki Konishi, although in Pokémon: Advanced Battle, Heracross was briefly voiced by Koichi Sakaguchi. Heracross would later be voiced by voice actor Yuji Ueda. In 2018's Pokémon the Movie: The Power of Us, a Heracross is voiced by Shinnosuke Ogami.

== Promotion and reception ==
Heracross has been featured on a number of merchandise, such as plushes, figurines, accessories, card sleeves, and clothing. In September 2013, a toy featuring Heracross for the Japan-exclusive arcade game Pokémon Tretta was one of six toys included in McDonald's Japan Happy Meals to commemorate the release of Pokémon X and Y. In Japan, a pokéfuta depicting Heracross and Chansey was installed in an area of Tamura, Fukushima.

Heracross has received positive reception from both critics and fans, with it being considered one of the best in the second generation as well as of all Bug-type Pokémon in the franchise. Dot Esports's Yash Nair lauded Heracross as "a kind, strong, and just Pokémon" due to its nature to protect and share food with weaker Pokémon. Maher pointed to these factors as well as its appearance in the anime as reasons for its popularity. In a video for Nintendo Life, Alex Olney declared Heracross to be one his all-time favourite Pokémon, however, Olney believed that its Mega form did not do the Pokémon justice, critiquing its enlarged design features as goofy. During a study in the Journal of Geek Studies about popular Pokémon compared to real-life animals, researcher Justine Le Vaillant noted that popular bug Pokémon such as Heracross created a large gap in votes between other arthropod-based Pokémon, with Heracross ranking 50th most popular out of 809 Pokémon. Writing for TheGamer, Cian Maher was critical of Nintendo, Game Freak, Niantic, Inc., and The Pokémon Company for their poor usage of Heracross, claiming it had been "done dirty". Maher pointed to how the companies neglected to do much with the Pokémon since its debut in the second generation, instead being relegated to areas that make it hard for the player to obtain, including Pokémon Go, or being neglected from games such as Pokémon Unite, with Maher finding the absence strange and describing the game as a "perfect fit" for Heracross. He did praise its appearance in New Pokémon Snap, but stated that it "only highlights how little it's esteem is recognised elsewhere." Similarly, Collider's Tyler Searle described Ash's Heracross in the anime as underutilised, believing it was side-lined in its debut generation by Ash until near the end and reminisced that "fans missed out on the chance to develop its personality beyond a powerful fighter with a sweet tooth."

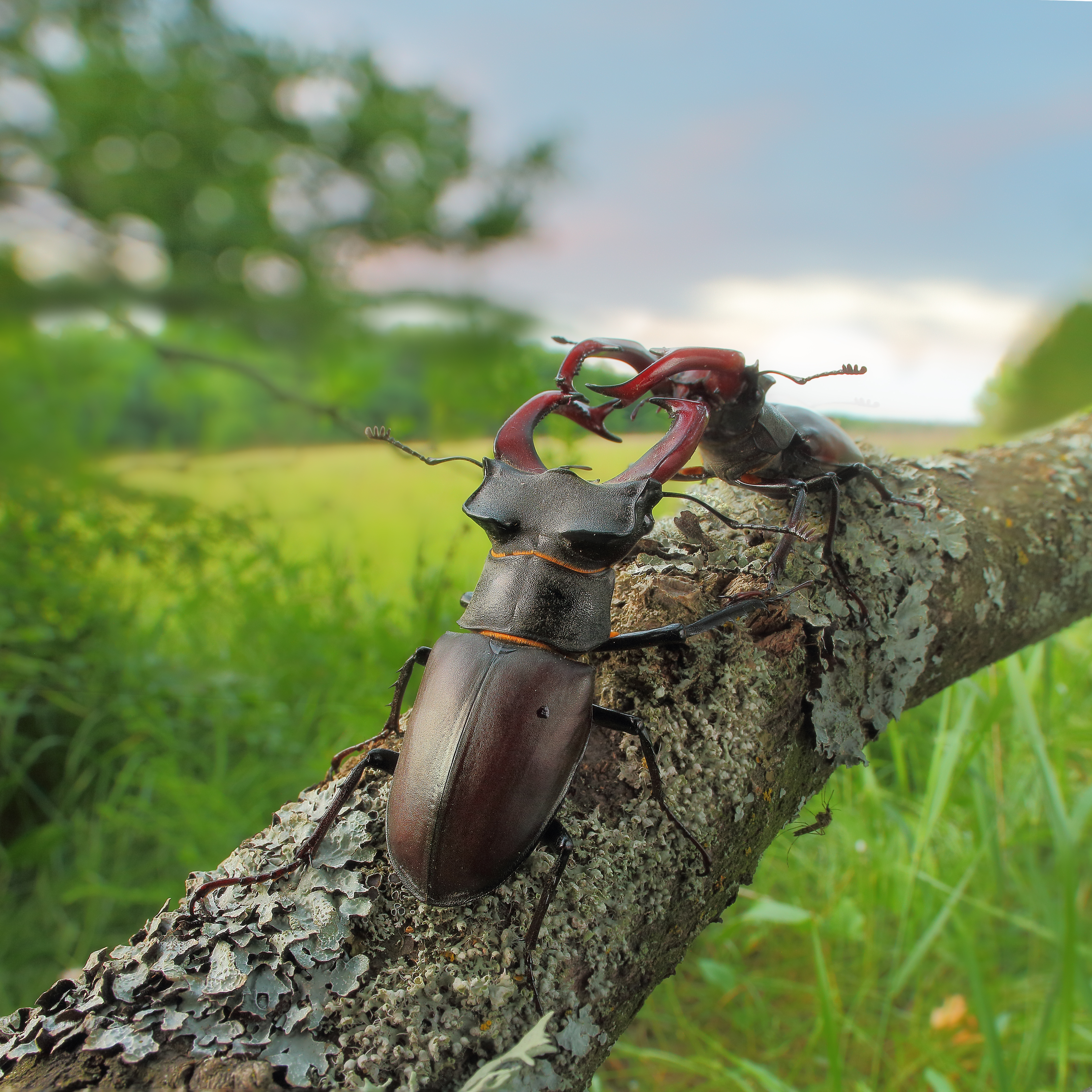
Insect fighting is a competitive activity in Japan where people pit two insects to fight each other

Many critics have highlighted Heracross for its competitive stats, particularly its strength and abilities. Writing for GamesRadar+, Raymond Padilla was disheartened by the Pokémon's lack of acknowledgement within the community and describe Heracross as a "lethal force" in the competitive scene due to its access to many offensive attacking moves and high attack stat, stating that it would not leave many Pokémon left to stand up against it. Additionally, Padilla noted that it had a variety of movesets for players to utilise, though he acknowledged that the primarily offensive movesets would be the ones players would use. TechRaptor's Robert Grosso expanded on Heracross's combat design by detailing that it had that in addition to its offensive capabilities, it had a powerful type combination that had few counters and a perfect stat distribution; he further praised Heracross's physical design as "incredibly eye-catching". Grosso linked both Heracross's physical and combat design aspects to the historical context of insect fighting, a popular activity in cultures of East Asia regions such as Japan, describing this as "fascinating to see a glimpse into the historical reality through a simple, but effective design." In IGN's "PokémonoftheDay" series of articles, the author respected Heracross and praised its stats as being perfectly laid for its strong move pool, stating that whilst it may be slightly overused, they would still recommend it as "hard-pressed to find another Bug or Fighter with this much personality and utter usefulness". They equally praised Heracross's signature move, Megahorn, as the best Bug-type move, citing that it is incredibly strong even to Pokémon not weak to Bug-type moves; the author, however, was dismayed that most Pokémon that were weak against it (Psychic- and Dark-types) were typically stronger or faster than Heracross, though they countered this point by arguing that Heracross's special defence stat was likely to resist strong attacks and allow the user to counterattack.

Nintendojo's Sam Stewart expressed that Heracross stood out on its own merits compared to Pinsir because of its typing in complement with its strength and moveset, highlight its signature move as its best. In GamesRadar's "Pokémon Monday" series, Henry Gilbert, Carolyn Gudmundson and Michael Grimm commended Heracross's design as being a good balance between cool and cute, noting that the fact it smiled subverted previous depictions of tough Pokémon that only looked unhappy and fierce. Gudmundson expressed that whilst it is commonly compared to Pinsir, Heracross did a lot to stand out on its own such as with its typing, with Gilbert and Grimm adding that compared to a lot of other Bug-types, Heracross was one of a few that was useful in battles as well as looking appealing. In IGN's "PokémonoftheDay" series of articles, the author similarly compared the two, acknowledging that Heracross was an improvement of the "battle beetle" design and that Pinsir was seen more as a prototype; he joked that Pinsir was the "neglected, less successful brother of the over-achieving and younger Heracross."

Both critics and fans praised the inclusion of Bois in Legends Z-A. His popularity was derived mostly from him being obtainable early in the game, which coupled with his strength, his ability to learn moves such as "Pin Missile" and being able to Mega Evolve, made him a staple for many players' teams for the rest of the game. Due to Bois's prospects of being obtainable early in the game and being able to sweep an entire team of Pokémon with ease, he became a core mainstay in many any% glitchless speedruns of the game, with some speedrunners even dedicating a segment on their timers to denote obtaining Bois as an important part of the speedrun. Another aspect that contributed to his popularity is due to his design and animations, with Polygon's Patricia Hernandez joking that he "doesn't have a single thought running through its brain", which she believed made Bois more endearing. Bois's name was met with speculation about why it was chosen, with some outlets noting that in French it stood for "drink" or "wood", though none were sure what this could mean. Due to the French connection, Hernandez speculated it was likely pronounced like "bwuah", but acknowledged many English-speaking players pronounced the name as "boys", which also contributed to spawning memes around the name. Memes and appreciation posts of Bois were created and shared on social media such as Twitter, Instagram and Reddit about how Bois always had the player's back and was considered an icon or "GOAT" in Z-A.

In an article for the academic journal Laws, Angus Nurse and Elliot Doornbos explained how Heracross's creation may be linked to an influence in the increasing demand for rhinoceros beetles in both the legal and illegal insect markets of Japan for the purposes of being kept as pets or for insect fighting, citing Heracross as an example of how depictions of rhinoceros beetles in Japanese popular culture led to its popularity among young people and collectors.
