= 2002 Japan animal cruelty case =

Killing of a cat in Japan

The 2002 Japan animal cruelty case (福岡猫虐待事件, Fukuoka neko gyakutai jiken; "Fukuoka cat cruelty case") was an animal cruelty case involving the torture and death of a cat in Japan. The case was a significant development as Japanese animal abuse laws had previously been lax and seldom enforced.

On May 6 and May 7, 2002, Jun Matsubara (松原 潤, Matsubara Jun), an unemployed 26-year-old man from Kure, Hiroshima Prefecture, captured a kitten in his Fukuoka neighborhood and took it into his home. Matsubara tortured the cat for four hours by cutting off its ear and tail before strangling the cat with a piece of string. Matsubara hung the cat into a river. Matsubara took photographs of the torture and posted them onto 2channel. A placard seen in the final photograph reads in Japanese "Offer to the brothers of Kuromutsu in the world!! Oscar Dill". Kuromutsu generally refers to people that kill dogs and cats; it is used on 2ch to refer to the "I hate pets" subforum.

A poster discovered the pictures and contacted the appropriate authorities, who then proceeded to arrest Matsubara. Matsubara was sentenced on October 21, 2002 to six months' imprisonment, but the judge suspended the jail term for three years because his privacy was violated due to the incident and they were humiliated by various kinds of harassment."

Private information about Matsubara and his family was posted on the Internet by people angered by his crime.

The cat who died was posthumously named "Kogenta" (こげんた) by a Buddhist priest.

== See also ==
- Animal welfare and rights in Japan
- Pet culture in Japan
