= Pinsir =

Pokémon species

- Pokémon character
- Pinsir artwork by Ken Sugimori
- First game: Pokémon Red and Blue (1996)
- Created by: Ken Sugimori
- Designed by: Ken Sugimori (original)
- Voiced by: Tatsuki Kobe; Shin-ichiro Miki

In-universe information
- Species: Pokémon
- Type: Bug; Bug and Flying (Mega)

Pinsir (/ˈpɪnsər/), known in Japan as Kailios (Japanese: カイロス, Hepburn: Kairosu), is a Pokémon species in Nintendo and Game Freak's Pokémon franchise. First introduced in Pokémon Red and Blue, it was created by designer Ken Sugimori, and was one of the first Pokémon conceived for the titles. Since Pinsir's debut, it has appeared in multiple games including Pokémon Go and the Pokémon Trading Card Game, as well as various merchandise. In media related to the franchise, Pinsir has been voiced by Tatsuki Kobe and Shin-ichiro Miki.

Classified as a Bug-type Pokémon, Pinsir resembles an upright bipedal stag beetle, with a round brown body and two white pincer horns protruding from the sides of its head, while its mouth is a horizontal row of teeth in the center of its body. While it was at one point intended to receive an evolution in sequel titles Pokémon Gold and Silver, later games Pokémon X and Y introduced the concepts of Mega Evolutions, and with it Mega Pinsir.

Pinsir has received positive reception since its debut, particularly for its design which has been described as having a natural feel. Despite this, it has also been seen as somewhat pushed aside by Game Freak with the later introduction of similar Pokémon such as Heracross. Pinsir has maintained fans within the player community, and cited as well as highlighted as an example of Nintendo's dedication to design diversity through their use of it in merchandise related to the Pokémon franchise.

== Conception and creation ==
Pinsir is a species of fictional creatures called Pokémon created for the Pokémon media franchise. Developed by Game Freak and published by Nintendo, the Japanese franchise began in 1996 with the video games Pokémon Red and Green for the Game Boy, which were later released in North America as Pokémon Red and Blue in 1998. In these games and their sequels, the player assumes the role of a Trainer whose goal is to capture and use the creatures' special abilities to combat other Pokémon. Some Pokémon can transform into stronger species through a process called evolution via various means, such as exposure to specific items. Each Pokémon has one or two elemental types, which define its advantages and disadvantages when battling other Pokémon. A major goal in each game is to complete the Pokédex, a comprehensive Pokémon encyclopedia, by capturing, evolving, and trading with other Trainers to obtain individuals from all Pokémon species.

Created by Ken Sugimori, Pinsir was one of the earliest Pokémon designed during the planning stages of Red and Blue, back when the games were intended to be called Capsule Monsters, appearing on early concept sprite art for the game. As work on the game progressed, a single color identity was chosen in order to work within the Super Game Boy's hardware limitations. Once development was complete, Sugimori re-drew the species along with the others in his own art style to give the game a unified look and finalize design elements. Called Yairos early in development, it was later changed to Kailios for the final release. When the games were localized for English-speaking audiences, Nintendo of America gave the various Pokémon species descriptive names related to their appearance or features as a means to make them more relatable to American children. Its name was localized to Pinsir, inspired by its character design.

=== Design ===
Early builds of Pokemon Gold and Silver featured an evolution for Pinsir.

Standing 4 feet 11 inches (119 cm) tall, Pinsir is classified as a Bug-type Pokémon. Resembling an upright bipedal stag beetle, it has a large, round brown body with two arms and two and legs. While the legs are short and thick, its arms are long and slender. Both have visible joints, with the shoulders being large and bulbous on the sides of its body. Its hands and feet each have three claws, while it has two eyes in the upper middle of its head. Its mouth meanwhile is near the center of its body, and is oriented vertically instead of horizontally, with several teeth extending from the sides towards the center. Two long pincer horns protrude from the sides of its head, covered with smaller spike protrusions.

An unused evolution for Pinsir was included in an early, unreleased version of the games Pokémon Gold and Silver. This unused Pokémon has been referred to as both Purakkasu and Plucks, and featured an additional horn between its pincers along with a mask-like face in the upper center, replacing Pinsir's eyes and mouth on the design. Years later, the games Pokémon X and Y introduced Mega Evolutions that allow certain Pokémon to temporarily transform through the use of in-game items. In Pinsir's case, it can become Mega Pinsir, a Bug- and Flying-type Pokémon. Increasing in size to 5 ft 7 in (170 cm) tall, it gains large yellow wings protruding from its body. Its eyes also turn yellow, while it gains additional protrusions on its horns and arms. Its toes also change, now extending in downward spikes.

== Appearances ==
Pinsir first appeared in the 1996 games Pokémon Red and Blue. In these games, it is only obtainable in Pokémon Red, and can only be found in the Safari Zone area, or by exchanging collectable coin items for it in the Celadon City Casino. In Yellow, it can be obtained in the same way, though the cost of purchasing one in the casino is substantially higher. In the remakes of the games, Pokémon FireRed and LeafGreen, Pinsir can be obtained exclusively in LeafGreen through the same means. In later titles, it appears in Pokémon Ruby and Sapphire, Pokémon Pearl, Pokémon Platinum, and in the post-game content for Pokémon Black and White. Pinsir also appears in Pokémon X and Y, where it can be caught exclusively in the X version, and can evolve into Mega Pinsir by holding the Pinsirite in-game item. Pinsir also appears in Pokémon Sword and Shield, where it was added to the game via the downloadable content expansion The Isle of Armor.

In tie-in games related to the franchise, Pinsir also appears in Pokémon Go, and appears in Pokémon Masters EX, where it is paired alongside the trainer Noland from Pokémon Emerald. Pinsir appears in other spin-off games, such as Pokémon Stadium, Pokémon Sleep, New Pokémon Snap, and Pokémon Quest. In physical media, a plush toy of Pinsir was produced as part of the Pokémon Fit toyline, while cards featuring the character have been produced for the Pokémon Trading Card Game.

Pinsir also appears in the related anime. It first appeared in the series' fourth episode, "The Challenge of The Samurai", where a wandering samurai uses it to battle protagonist Ash Ketchum's Metapod. Another Pinsir later appears in the series, where it captured by protagonist Goh. It develops a crush on a trainer's Heracross, leading to Goh trading with the trainer to obtain Heracross. In these appearances, Pinsir is voiced by Tatsuki Kobe and Shin-ichiro Miki.

== Critical reception ==
Pinsir has been well received since its debut. Nintendo Life's Alex Olney in a retrospective of Pokémon from Red and Blue praised Pinsir heavily, stating that the large mandible-like pincers on its head and how its design emphasized it as its main feature made Pinsir look "kinda believable, real". He elaborated by stating to him the pincers looked intimidating and made to fight, but at the same time awkward in what he called a tradeoff, adding "there's something natural about that and so appealing". However, despite the glowing praise, he felt it was still behind fellow Bug-type Pokémon Scyther, an opinion shared by fellow reviewer Jon Cartwright. The staff of IGN, in their "Pokémon of the Day" series of articles, focused instead on its mouth, stating that not only did it have "the coolest mouth in the Pokémon world," but also "some of the gnarliest, ugliest, coolest teeth ever drawn", something they did not expect from a franchise known for its "cute-&-cuddly little creatures". They additionally felt Pinsir's design was more fitting for the Pokémon franchise, and its emphasis on creature-based combat.

Pinsir has often been compared to other insect Pokémon, particularly Heracross, another beetle species in Pokémon Gold and Silver that is classified as both a Bug- and Fighting-type. IGN felt that Heracross's introduction undermined Pinsir's presence, stating that "under scrutiny, one realises [sic] Pinsir is really a part-Fighting Pokémon" due to the numerous Fighting-type attacks available to it. To them, Heracross appeared to be the completion of Pinsir's "prototype" design, leaving the latter "sent to the Bin of Shame". Screen Rant's Scott Baird meanwhile made a more direct correlation, proposing that Pinsir's planned evolution for Gold and Silver may have been repurposed for Heracross, pointing out the similarities in their designs as development on the games progressed, notably an early design for Heracross where its mouth was sideways like Pinsir's. Meanwhile, Alex Lucard writing for Beckett Pokémon Unofficial Collector magazine stated while Pinsir was always considered "one of the coolest looking" Pokémon, it was overshadowed by others such as Scyther which had gained evolutions in later games. Though he felt Pinsir was still an interesting character with a storied presence in the franchise, he expressed his opinion that some players seemed more inclined to capture it solely to further complete their Pokédex.

Fan reaction to Pinsir has also been particularly strong. Said fans, along with Taiwanese gaming website ZhaiZhaiNews, voiced their dismay at its absence from Pokémon Sword and Shield along with its Mega Evolution, the latter aspect seen as a significant character moment for the species due to its joy of flying. Pinsir was later one of the most requested character for inclusion in Sword and Shield's downloadable content, surprising the staff of Inside Games who acknowledged it had a large following based on its character appeal despite its "disgusting ... characteristic mouth". Ryo Hirose, a researcher in the Lifestyle Research Department at Japan's Nikkei Research Institute, wrote for The Mainichi about how characters such as Pinsir helped represent the diversity of the Pokémon franchise. Reacting to a story of a child insisting of a toy of Pinsir despite the mother's protests that she should find a "cute" toy instead, Ryo emphasized that characters such as Pinsir and how fans reacted to them illustrated how they had grown to love more than just the franchise's "popular" characters due to the attachments they had formed with them in the games. In this manner, while he felt the term diversity was often thrown, to him the franchise exemplified it due to its support of such characters in merchandise and similar.

While Pinsir and Heracross are often portrayed as rivals within the franchise in games such as New Pokémon Snap, Pinsir holds a similar rivalry with another stag beetle-inspired Pokémon, Vikavolt. R. A. Schmidt-Jeffris and J. C. Nelson, writing for American Entomologist, felt that these displays helped re-emphasize Japanese cultural interest in insects and Japanese youths use of such beetles in insect battles.
