= Kagome (company) =

Japanese manufacturing company

Kagome Co., Ltd.
- Native name: カゴメ株式会社
- Romanized name: Kagome Kabushiki-gaisha
- Company type: Public (K.K.)
- Traded as: TYO: 2811
- Industry: Food
- Founded: 1899 (business founded); 1949 (incorporated)
- Founder: Ichitaro Kanie
- Headquarters: Nagoya, Aichi, Japan
- Number of locations: 17
- Area served: Asia, North America
- Key people: Koji Kioka, President
- Products: Tomato products Drinks
- Number of employees: 2,209 (2013)
- Divisions: Beverage Products; Food Products; Institutional & Industrial Products; Fresh Vegetables; Overseas; Research and Development
- Website: kagome.co.jp

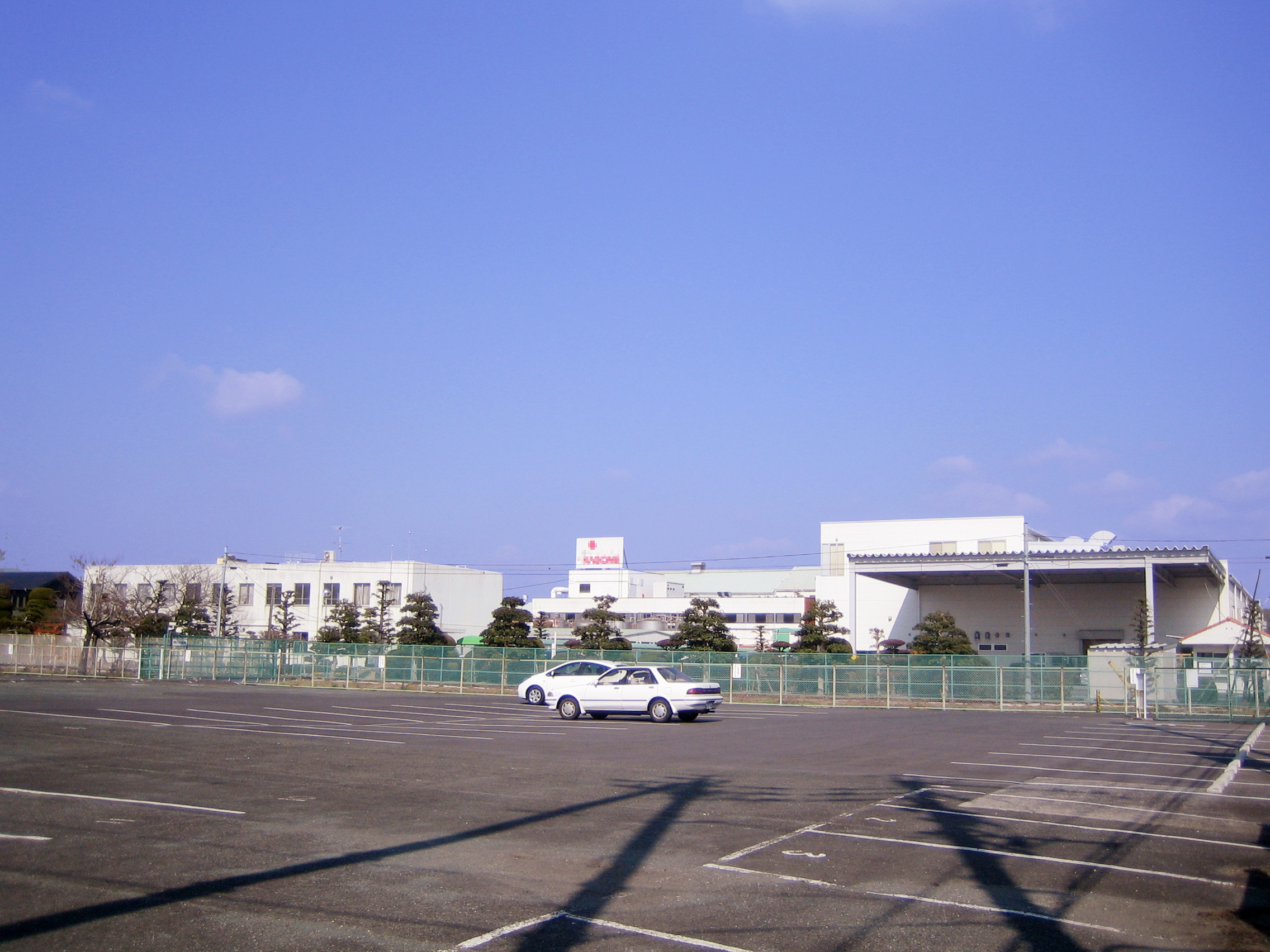
Kagome is a major processor of fruit and vegetables in Japan

Kagome Co., Ltd. (カゴメ株式会社, Kagome Kabushiki-gaisha) is a Japanese manufacturer and distributor of tomato-based foods, and fruit and vegetable juices.

Its core product is the Yasai Seikatsu 100 brand of vegetable juice, introduced in 1995. It also claims to be Japan's largest supplier of tomato ketchup and tomato juice. Kagome grows tomatoes in greenhouses and market gardens in Japan.

Since 2007, it has partnered with Asahi Breweries (TYO: 2502) to develop low alcohol fruit and vegetable drinks. U.S.-based global fast food restaurateur, Yum! Brands, awarded its 2008 Asia Franchise STAR to Kagome.

== History ==
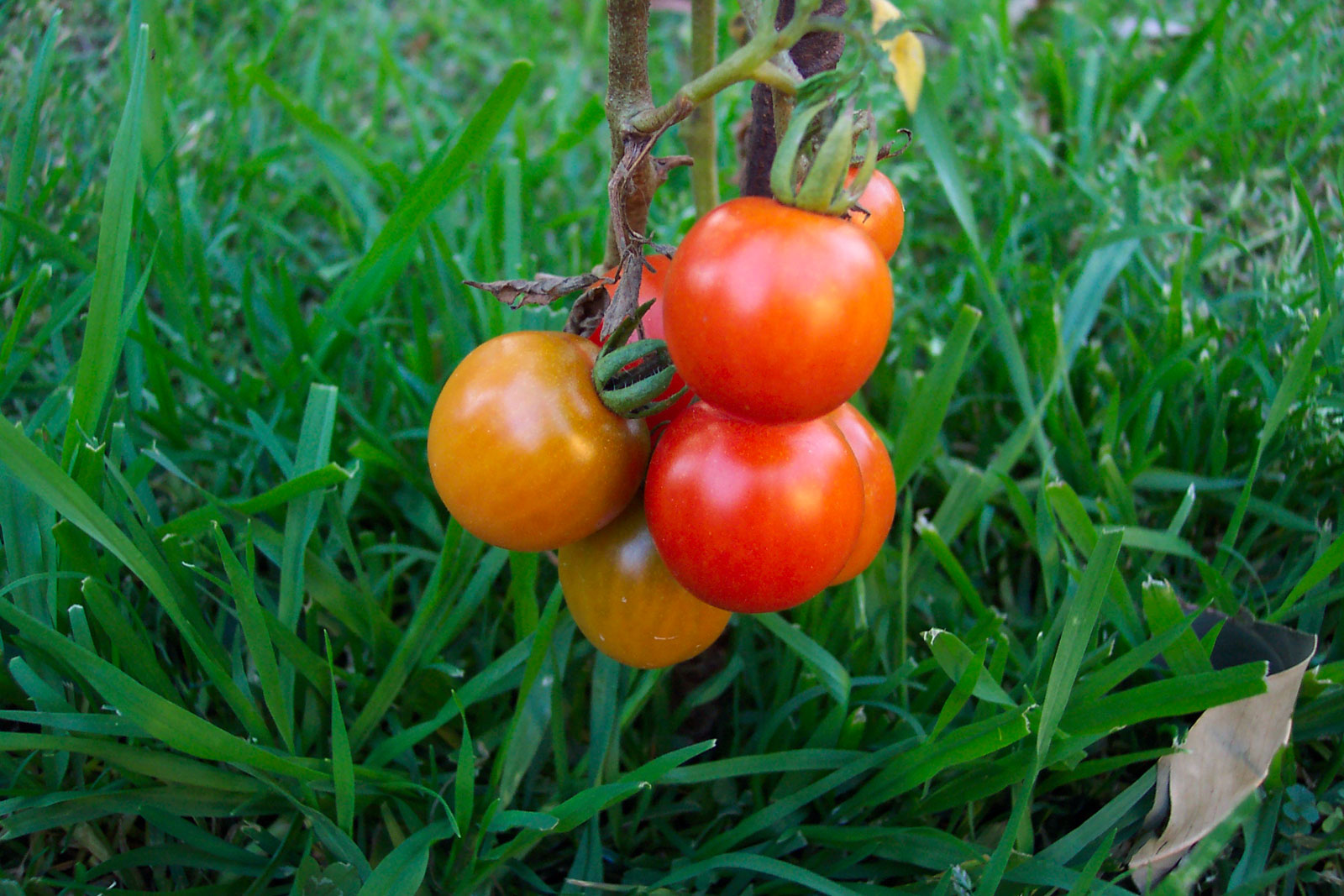
Kagome started as a tomato grower, and its main products are still based on tomatoes

Ichitaro Kanie began cultivating tomatoes in 1899 — according to Kagome, these were the first grown in Japan. He soon began producing tomato ketchup and Worcester sauce. However, tomato juice was not sold until 1933. The Kagome trademark was registered in 1917, and the Aichi Tomato Co., Ltd was incorporated in 1949. In 1963, Aichi Tomato became Kagome Co., Ltd, and fifteen years later, gained a listing on the Tokyo Stock Exchange.

Beginning with the 1998 incorporation of a United States subsidiary, Kagome developed overseas, with subsidiaries and minority stakes in affiliates in Asia, North America and Europe, and a strategic alliance with the H. J. Heinz Company. It also purchased a Japanese company specializing in vegetable lactic acid bacteria, Yukijirushi Labio Co., Ltd, now Kagome Labio Co., Ltd.
