= Marusan-Ai =

Japanese food manufacturer

Marusan-Ai Co., Ltd.
- Native name: マルサンアイ株式会社
- Traded as: NAG: 2551
- Industry: Miso, Soy milk, beverages
- Founded: March 1952; 74 years ago
- Headquarters: 1, Arashita, Nikki-cho, Okazaki, Aichi, Japan
- Website: www.marusanai.co.jp/en/

Marusan-Ai Co., Ltd. (マルサンアイ) is a food manufacturer that produces and sells miso and soy milk. It was founded in March 1952, as Okazaki Jozo Co., Ltd. Its headquarters is located at 1, Arashita, Nikki-cho, Okazaki, Aichi, Japan.

Originally a miso manufacturer, the company launched soy milk beverages in the 1980s and featured rakugo storyteller Bunchin Katsura (桂 文珍) in its commercials. With the catchphrase "Soybean milk is good for your body" (「お豆(まめ)のお乳(ちち) からだにえ〜よ〜」), the company's recognition spread nationwide. Even today, it remains a major player in the soy milk beverage industry and is a standalone listed company on the Nagoya Stock Exchange's main market.

== Naming ==
In 1964, the company rebranded from its original name, Okazaki Jozo Co., Ltd. , incorporating its product brand name "Marusan" to become "Okazaki Marusan Co., Ltd." At the time, a blended miso combining red and white miso, known as "mix miso," became a hit product in the Chubu region. This success provided a great opportunity to align the product brand with the company name.

Later, the company's nationwide expansion was realized during the first soy milk boom in 1983. Through an internal naming contest, the company adopted "Marusan Ai Co., Ltd.," incorporating "Ai" (kanji 愛, which means love) instead of the geographical reference to Okazaki.

The "Ai" in "Marusan-Ai Co., Ltd." carries multiple meanings: "Ai" from Aichi Prefecture (愛知県), "Ai" as in love for customers and products, and "I" from "International." While the name no longer includes "Okazaki," it still reflects the company's commitment to its hometown and its ambitions for domestic and international business expansion.
