= Pet culture in Japan =

Aspect of Japanese culture

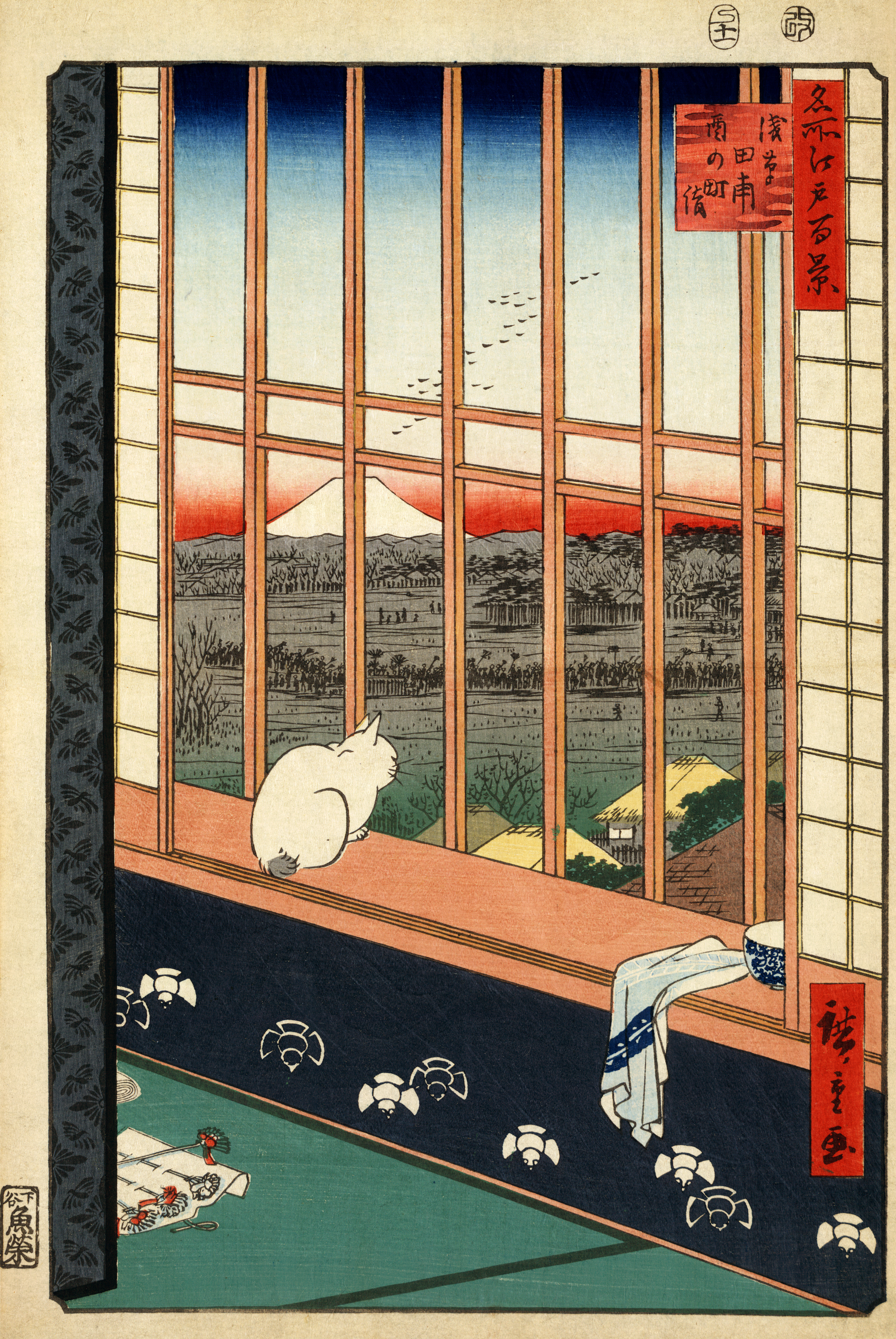
Ukiyo-e print showing a domestic cat sitting on a wall where the sliding panels have been opened, watching the festival procession in the rice paddies nearby, with view of Mount Fuji in the distance. Number 101 in the series One Hundred Famous Views from Edo by Hiroshige (1856)

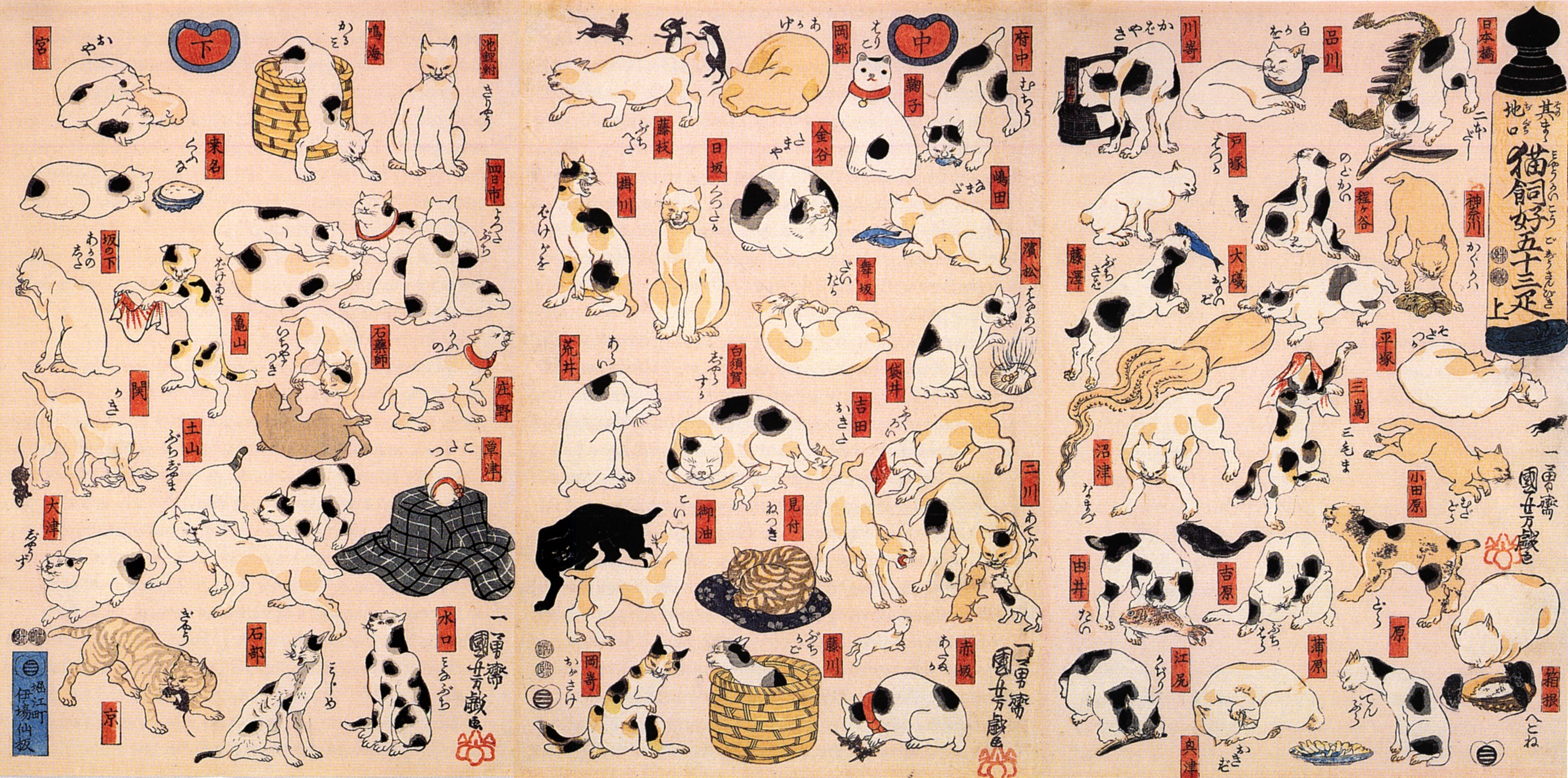
Cats Suggested as The Fifty-three Stations of the Tōkaidō woodblock print by Utagawa Kuniyoshi (1850)

Pet culture in Japan has a long history going back centuries, especially in regards to cats. Pets were originally referred to as aigandōbutsu (愛玩動物 lit. "beloved toy-animal") or short-form aiganbutsu, but the terminology has changed in the 20th century into the anglicised petto (ペット).

== History ==
As early as the Heian period in Japan (794–1185), cats were highly valued and considered rare treasures, often exchanged among the upper class as luxury items akin to precious jewels. Ownership of cats was primarily restricted to the emperor and the nobility, with records indicating that some aristocrats even bestowed court ranks upon them. In 889 Emperor Uda documented in his diary Kanpyō Gyoki the gift of a kitten he had received. He described the cat's deep ink-colored fur and meticulously noted its behaviors, such as its tendency to curl into a circle when resting and its hunting practices. The emperor was so captivated by the kitten that he compared its cries to those of a black dragon, reflecting the deep affection and admiration he had for his pet. These writings provide insight into the esteem in which cats were held during this era.

Domestic cats have been a popular theme depicted in ukiyo-e woodprints, made by artists such as Utagawa Kuniyoshi, Utagawa Hiroshige, and Tsukioka Yoshitoshi. Since cats were smaller than dogs and required lower maintenance overall, they fitted the Japanese lifestyle and size of rooms and houses better. Domestic dogs living at home did not make their appearance as house pets until much later, since breeds such as the Akita originally were used for guarding and hunting. Domestic cats outnumber domestic dogs in Japan.

A remarkable exception to the earlier treatments of dogs was during the rule of shōgun Tokugawa Tsunayoshi (1646 – 1709). A devout Buddhist, he implemented wide animal protection laws, particularly those concerning dogs. These policies earned him the nickname “Inu-Kubō” (犬公方), which translates to “Dog Shōgun.” While derided during his time, more recent evaluation has shown his policies to be very progressive and equivalent to modern-day animal rights and welfare protection. His reign marked the first comprehensive and enforced animal welfare rights in Japan since the rule of Emperor Tenmu (673–686).

Birds such as the varied tit (山雀 yamagara) were kept due to their song, also at Shinto shrines and for popular entertainment during the Edo period.

Fish have a long tradition as pets such as native species like the Japanese rice fish (南目高 medaka). Goldfish (金魚 kingyo) were introduced through China in the 16th century and were first popular amongst the aristocracy and samurai class and later the merchant class due to their auspicious colours and small size. Breeding of goldfish resulted in a large variety unique to Japan. The list of goldfish varieties includes species such as the Chinshurin, Izumo Nankin, Jikin, Hana fusa, Oranda, Ranchū, Ryūkin, Shubunkin, Shukin, Tamasaba, Tosakin, Wakin, and many others. Goldfish were depicted also in a humorous manner in woodblock print by artists such as Utagawa Kuniyoshi in works such as the Kingyo-zukushi Hyaku-monogatari (“A Variety of Goldfish: A Hundred Terrifying Tales”) and Kingyo-zukushi Tama-ya Tama-ya (“A Variety of Goldfish: Bubbles for Sale”).

The natural conditions in Japan give rise to a large number of different insects, who thrive especially during the summer season when foliage is lush and rain and humidity levels high. Insects in Japanese culture play a central role especially in regards to the seasons. This has developed to keeping the bell cricket (鈴虫 suzumushi) originally in aristocratic circles and the Japanese rhinoceros beetle (カブトムシ kabutomushi) and stag beetle (鍬形虫 kuwagatamushi) and similar species as pets due to their small size and low maintenance requirements.

Over the last few decades, pet ownership in Japan apart from cats has gradually moved from a predominantly utilitarian function to a concept that more fully incorporates pets into the family system. In many cases, pets are now considered to be family members. To many Japanese, pets are as well loved as children, and may even serve as a substitute for those who choose to forgo child-rearing.

== Spiritual hierarchy ==
In the context of spiritual hierarchy, pets occupy the space directly below humans, but above all other animals and forms of life. This position is not clearly defined, leaving many aspects of pet ownership open to interpretation, including the practice of keeping and caring for pets, as well as the correct means of caring for them after death. This position within the family is presented through various forms within the everyday flow of contemporary life, spiritual expression, memorialization, and burial rites of Japanese pets.

While wild animals such as kitsune (fox), Japanese boar or Bake-danuki (racoon dog) have always held a high position in Shintoism and Japanese mythology, of all domestic animals cats were esteemed the highest, entering mythological folklore and attributed special powers good and evil such as the Kaibyō.

== Pet boom ==
Medaka fish kept in a ceramic bowl in Tokyo

Pets have been increasing in numbers throughout Japan. Providing a convenient way for companionship without having the demands that a child would, pets are a popular alternative for people who do not have the time required to raise a baby. Although it is not by any means definitive, studies reflect a trend showing that adopting pets into the family in lieu of children has become increasingly common. Currently, “estimates place the number of pets above the number of children under the age of fifteen.”

The Japanese “pet boom” can be traced back to 2003 where it was estimated that the combined number of cats and dogs in Japan have outnumbered the number of children. The estimated number of pets and children under 16 in Japan was 19.2 and 17.9 million respectively in 2003, and 23.2 million to 17 million in 2009.

During Japan's period of rapid economic growth, a pet boom led to an increase in the number of households keeping dogs and cats. As a consequence, the number of dogs and cats euthanized at hokenjo [ja], public health centers operated by local governments, for various reasons reached 1,221,000 in 1974. Since then, amid a broader rise in public awareness of animal welfare in Japanese society, the number of animals euthanized has declined sharply over the following 50 years, falling to less than one-hundredth of that figure and reaching only about 9,000 as of 2023, according to statistics from the Ministry of the Environment.

== Pets in everyday life ==
Although Japan's crowded environment makes for a not so pet-friendly country, Japanese have found ways to incorporate their pets into their everyday lives. One method is to choose small dog breeds as their companions. Some common dog breeds for Japanese families are chihuahuas, miniature dachshunds, and toy poodles. The most common reason for choosing small breed dogs are the lack of space, and easier cleaning.

Although small dogs are preferred, one of the most popular dog breeds in Japan is the Shiba Inu, which can grow to be two feet tall and weigh up to 25 pounds. Some Japanese prefer the Shiba Inu because they are family-friendly and have a lifespan of up to 15 years, making the Shiba Inu a long-lived companion. The Japanese also have an even larger breed that originated in Japan, the Akita, popularized by the story of Hachikō.

Because of the declining birthrate and aging population in Japan, there are an increasing number of households in Japan with pets and no children. Since some families have no children, they instead pamper and lavish their pets like they would do their own children. Businesses in Japan such as cat cafes, dog spas, and restaurants that allow pets to sit down at a table and eat with the rest of the family have been booming since 2004. Some pets in Japan even have the luxury of their own pet closets filled with expensive couture clothing from Chanel to Gucci designed specifically for pets.

Pets in Japan are not only for companionship. Therapy dogs play a huge role in helping the disabled, comforting hospital patients, and as companions for the elderly. Some organizations in Japan, such as the Tokyo-based International Therapy Dog Association train dogs with no owners into therapy dogs and send them to various nursing homes and hospitals throughout Japan. One such dog was the basis for a 2004 film Walking With Dogs: Chirori and Tamaru, where the main character, Chirori, instead of being put to sleep, was discovered by a Japanese singer and was trained to help the elderly. The story of Chirori was so inspiring, there is now a statue in her honor.

== Memorialization and posthumous care ==
Japanese traditional folk religion and Buddhism have significantly influenced the death rites of pets, and their memorialization thereafter. To some extent, Western culture and Christianity have also made an impact. However, the aspects present in such procedures vary across Japan and rely heavily upon the beliefs, traditions, and circumstances of each individual family.

Traditionally, pets were not often considered to be members of the family. Although there are some examples of pets being memorialized and given posthumous names during the mid-nineteenth century, there are few records of such efforts and those that exist have been attributed to the elite samurai class. During this time, most dogs and cats were considered community residents and did not inhabit any one individual home. Upon a community animal's death, folk tradition required that special care be taken of the deceased animal's remains, in order to protect the entire village from vengeful spirits. The concept of vengeful spirits comes from the belief that “small animals such as cats and dogs were believed to be able to travel freely between the here-and-now and the afterworld, and to possess the power to wreak spiritual vengeance (tatari) on people”. In order to ensure that the living would not be harmed, and in some instances to enlist good luck or protection from the animal spirit, special procedures were required, such as burial in a specific location of significance or inclusion of certain items within the animal's grave. If the correct process was followed, the village could rest assured that they would not be troubled by the deceased spirit.

Buddhist practices, specifically ancestral memorialization, have directly influenced the death rites and rituals performed for pets in Japan. However, "there are no scriptures specifically for animals, let alone pets" in Buddhist doctrine. Thus, memorialization of pets is left open to diverse interpretation. One central disagreement among spiritualists revolves around the Buddhist cycle of rebirth. Some individuals claim that it is indeed possible, through proper care during life and correct memorialization after death, for a beloved pet to eventually be reborn as a fellow human, thus making enlightenment achievable. Others feel that pets are only capable of being reborn as pets. Often, Buddhist clerics tend to allow families to decide for themselves what process they would like to follow. As different temples interpret the rites in different ways, they often combine various elements or omit some entirely.

Over the last few decades, pet cemeteries have increased in popularity, particularly within crowded urban areas. In rural areas, many pets are buried directly in the ground "in the hills outside the village, creating a harmony between the decay of the pet’s body and the fading away of memories and grief". In more urban, metropolitan areas, pet owners generally choose cremation for their lost companions. They can then choose to inter the ashes in individual or communal graves, or display the remains in columbaria On occasion, pet owners request to be buried with their deceased pets, and some choose to conduct the rites just as they would be conducted for a human. However, most "actual practices reinforce boundaries that place pets in a marginal position and delineate their liminal status within human society". In contrast with the traditional folk beliefs, the majority of pet owners no longer believe that the spirits of their deceased pets will cause them harm as a result of their choice of memorialization. Moreover, the rites and rituals serve as a means of easing the grief and loss of the living. As a result, "the significance of animal funerals in Japan has shifted from prayer for the animal soul to a way of expressing grief by the pet owner". Deceased pets are now more commonly remembered as members of the family, and are often memorialized at the family altar and become a part of the family's ancestry.

In contemporary society, elements of Western thought and Christianity have also become interwoven into burial practices of deceased pets. One example of this influence is found in the image of a "Rainbow Bridge", a concept very much like the Western ideal of heaven. The Rainbow Bridge is described as a utopian space where the deceased pet's spirit remains until the death of their owner, at which time both spirits travel together into the realm of heaven. This concept further emphasizes the growing familial connection between pets and their owners in contemporary Japan.

== See also ==
- Nekonomics – Cat-related economic consumption in Japan
