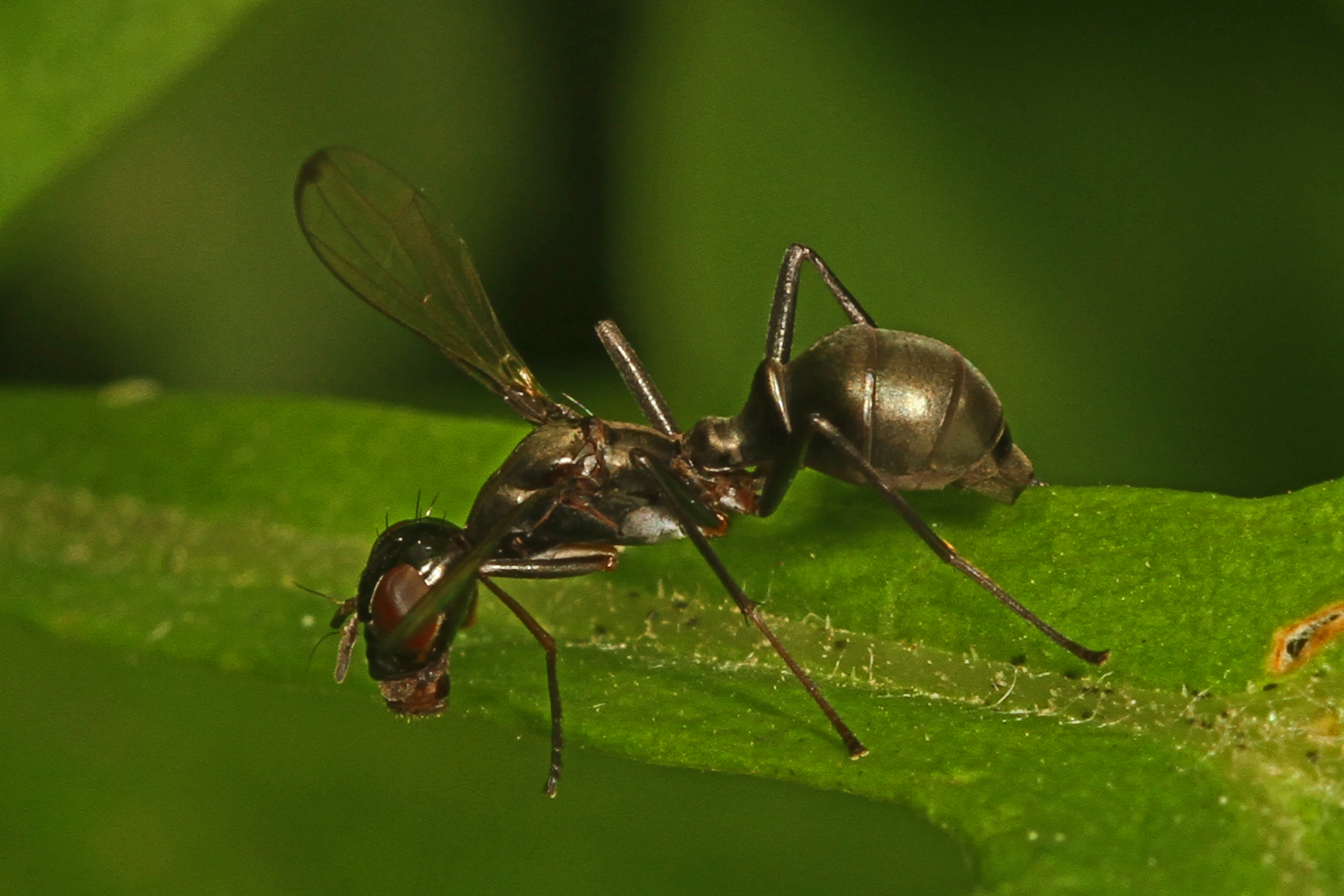
- Myrmecothea myrmecoides

Scientific classification
- Kingdom: Animalia
- Phylum: Arthropoda
- Class: Insecta
- Order: Diptera
- Family: Ulidiidae
- Subfamily: Otitinae
- Tribe: Cephaliini
- Genus: Myrmecothea
- Species: M. myrmecoides

Binomial name
- Myrmecothea myrmecoides (Loew, 1860)

Synonyms
- Cephalia myrmecoides Loew, 1860

= Myrmecothea myrmecoides =

Species of fly

Myrmecothea myrmecoides is a species of ulidiid or picture-winged fly in the genus Cephalia of the family Ulidiidae.

== Distribution ==
United States
