= Pterotaenia rivelloides =

Scientific classification
- Kingdom: Animalia
- Phylum: Arthropoda
- Class: Insecta
- Order: Diptera
- Family: Ulidiidae
- Subfamily: Otitinae
- Tribe: Cephaliini
- Genus: Pterotaenia
- Species: P. rivelloides

Binomial name
- Pterotaenia rivelloides (Blanchard, 1967)

Synonyms
- Platyeuxesta rivelloides Blanchard, 1967

Species of fly

Pterotaenia rivelloides is a species of ulidiid or picture-winged fly in the genus Platyeuxesta of the family Ulidiidae.

== Distribution ==
Argentina.
