= Myiomyrmica fenestrata =

Scientific classification
- Kingdom: Animalia
- Phylum: Arthropoda
- Class: Insecta
- Order: Diptera
- Family: Ulidiidae
- Subfamily: Otitinae
- Tribe: Cephaliini
- Genus: Myiomyrmica
- Species: M. fenestrata

Binomial name
- Myiomyrmica fenestrata (Coquillett, 1900)

Synonyms
- Cephalia fenestrata Coquillett, 1900

Species of fly

Myiomyrmica fenestrata is a species of ulidiid or picture-winged fly in the genus Cephalia of the family Ulidiidae.

== Distribution ==
United States.
