= Tritoxa cuneata =

Scientific classification
- Kingdom: Animalia
- Phylum: Arthropoda
- Class: Insecta
- Order: Diptera
- Family: Ulidiidae
- Subfamily: Otitinae
- Tribe: Cephaliini
- Genus: Tritoxa
- Species: T. cuneata

Binomial name
- Tritoxa cuneata Loew, 1873

Species of fly

Tritoxa cuneata is a species of picture-winged fly in the genus Tritoxa of the family Ulidiidae.

== Distribution ==
Canada, United States.
