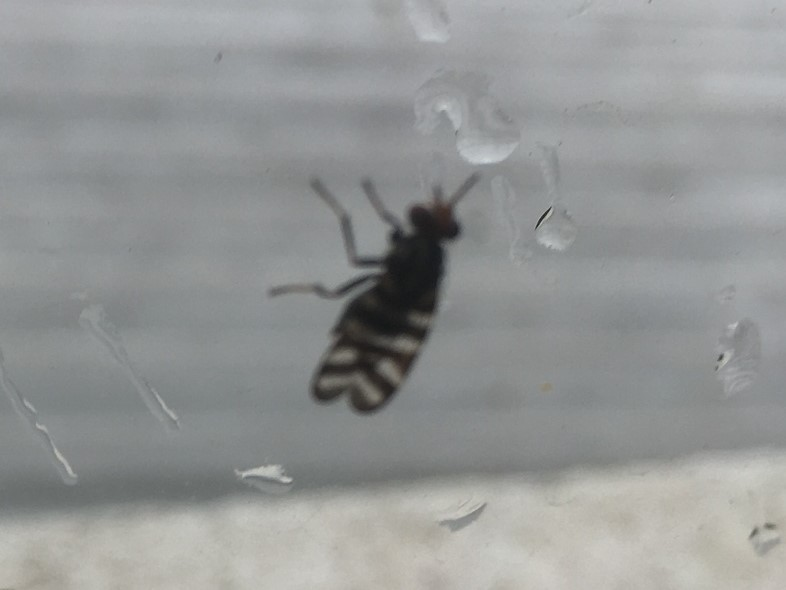

Scientific classification
- Kingdom: Animalia
- Phylum: Arthropoda
- Class: Insecta
- Order: Diptera
- Family: Ulidiidae
- Subfamily: Otitinae
- Tribe: Cephaliini
- Genus: Pterotaenia
- Species: P. fasciata

Binomial name
- Pterotaenia fasciata (Wiedemann, 1830)

Synonyms
- Ortalis fasciata (Wiedemann, 1830)

= Pterotaenia fasciata =

Species of fly

Pterotaenia fasciata is a species of ulidiid or picture-winged fly in the genus Pterotaenia of the family Ulidiidae.

== Distribution ==
Bolivia, Uruguay, Argentina, Chile.
