= Cephalia rufipes =

Scientific classification
- Kingdom: Animalia
- Phylum: Arthropoda
- Class: Insecta
- Order: Diptera
- Family: Ulidiidae
- Subfamily: Otitinae
- Tribe: Cephaliini
- Genus: Cephalia
- Species: C. rufipes

Binomial name
- Cephalia rufipes Meigen, 1826

Synonyms
- Myrmecomya formicaria Robineau-Desvoidy, 1830; Cephalia nigripes Meigen, 1826

Species of fly

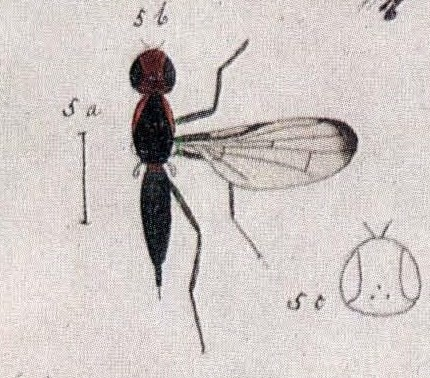

Cephalia rufipes is a species of ulidiid or picture-winged fly in the genus Cephalia of the family Ulidiidae.

== Distribution ==
Europe, North America.

== Gallery ==
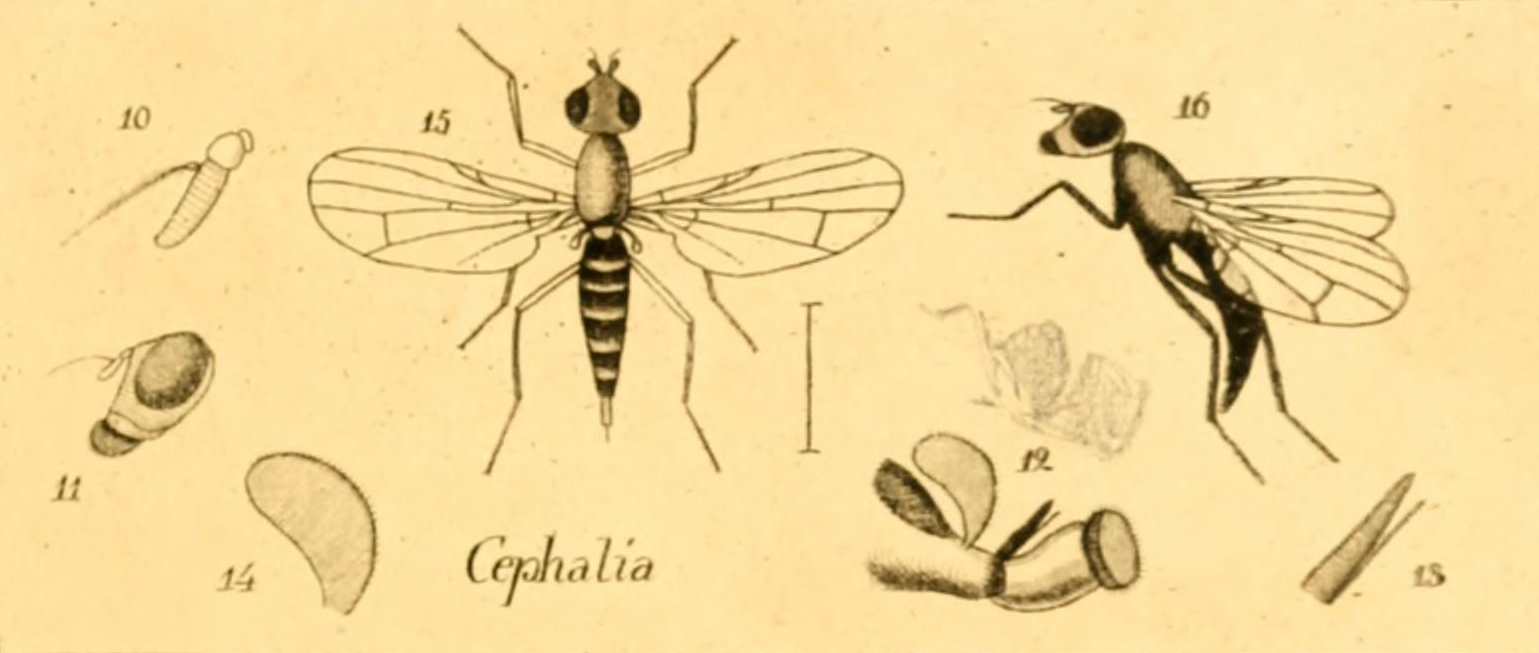
