= Tritoxa pollinosa =

Scientific classification
- Kingdom: Animalia
- Phylum: Arthropoda
- Class: Insecta
- Order: Diptera
- Family: Ulidiidae
- Subfamily: Otitinae
- Tribe: Cephaliini
- Genus: Tritoxa
- Species: T. pollinosa

Binomial name
- Tritoxa pollinosa Cole, 1919

Species of fly

Tritoxa pollinosa is a species of picture-winged fly in the genus Tritoxa of the family Ulidiidae.

== Distribution ==
United States.
