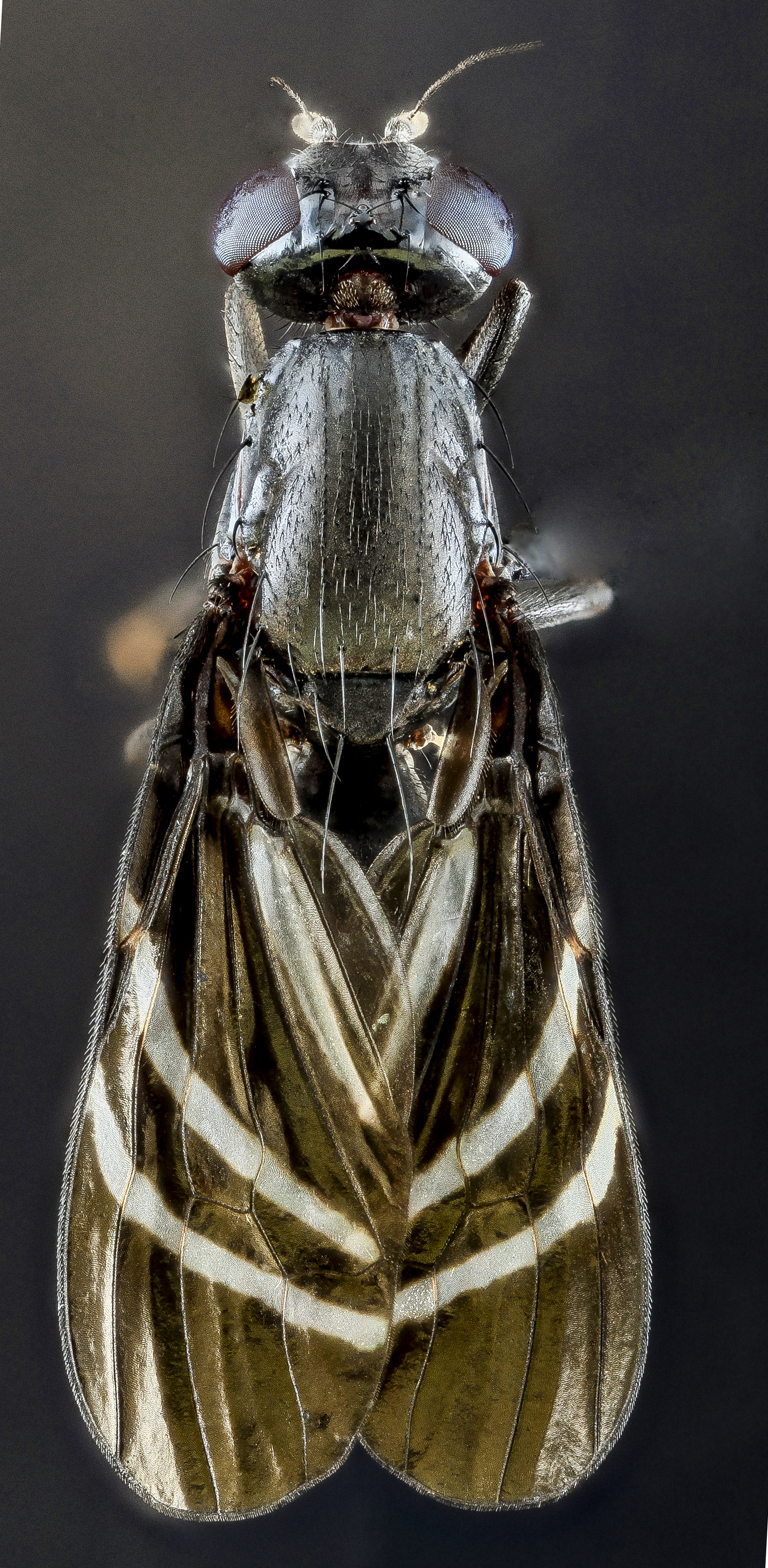

Scientific classification
- Kingdom: Animalia
- Phylum: Arthropoda
- Class: Insecta
- Order: Diptera
- Family: Ulidiidae
- Subfamily: Otitinae
- Tribe: Cephaliini
- Genus: Tritoxa
- Species: T. flexa

Binomial name
- Tritoxa flexa (Wiedemann, 1830)

Synonyms
- Trypeta flexa Wiedemann, 1830

= Tritoxa flexa =

Species of fly

Tritoxa flexa is a species of picture-winged fly in the genus Tritoxa of the family Ulidiidae.

== Distribution ==
Canada, United States.
