= Pterotaenia peruana =

Scientific classification
- Kingdom: Animalia
- Phylum: Arthropoda
- Class: Insecta
- Order: Diptera
- Family: Ulidiidae
- Subfamily: Otitinae
- Tribe: Cephaliini
- Genus: Pterotaenia
- Species: P. peruana

Binomial name
- Pterotaenia peruana Malloch, 1933

Species of fly

Pterotaenia peruana is a species of ulidiid or picture-winged fly in the genus Pterotaenia of the family Ulidiidae.

== Distribution ==
Peru, Chile.
