= Tritoxa ra =

Scientific classification
- Kingdom: Animalia
- Phylum: Arthropoda
- Class: Insecta
- Order: Diptera
- Family: Ulidiidae
- Subfamily: Otitinae
- Tribe: Cephaliini
- Genus: Tritoxa
- Species: T. ra

Binomial name
- Tritoxa ra Harriot, 1942

Species of fly

Tritoxa ra is a species of picture-winged fly in the genus Tritoxa of the family Ulidiidae.

== Distribution ==
United States.
