= C. fenestrata =

C. fenestrata may refer to:

- Cephalia fenestrata, a picture-winged fly species
- Cephaloleia fenestrata, a rolled-leaf beetle species in the genus Cephaloleia found in Costa Rica
- Chrysallida fenestrata, a sea snail species found in the Atlantic Ocean and the Mediterranean Sea
- Clidemia fenestrata, a plant species in the genus Clidemia
- Cochlearia fenestrata, the Arctic scurvy-grass, a plant species in the genus Cochlearia
- Cotinusa fenestrata, a jumping spider species in the genus Cotinusa found in Peru
- Crucigenia fenestrata, an algae species in the genus Crucigenia

== See also ==
- Fenestrata (disambiguation)
