= Herina nigrina =

Scientific classification
- Kingdom: Animalia
- Phylum: Arthropoda
- Class: Insecta
- Order: Diptera
- Family: Ulidiidae
- Genus: Herina
- Species: H. nigrina

Binomial name
- Herina nigrina (Meigen, 1826)

Synonyms
- Musca germinationis Rossi, 1790; Ortalis nigrina Meigen, 1826

Species of fly

Herina nigrina is a species of ulidiid or picture-winged fly in the genus Herina of the family Ulidiidae found in most of Western Europe.
