= Herina flavoscutellata =

Scientific classification
- Kingdom: Animalia
- Phylum: Arthropoda
- Clade: Pancrustacea
- Class: Insecta
- Order: Diptera
- Family: Ulidiidae
- Subfamily: Otitinae
- Tribe: Otitini
- Genus: Herina
- Species: H. flavoscutellata

Binomial name
- Herina flavoscutellata (Becker, 1900)

Synonyms
- Cephalia flavoscutellata

Species of fly

Herina flavoscutellata is a species of ulidiid or picture-winged fly in the family Ulidiidae.

== Distribution ==
Siberia.
