= O. palustris =

O. palustris may refer to:

- Oryzomys palustris, the marsh rice rat, a semiaquatic North American rodent.
- Ortalis palustris, a species of ulidiid or picture-winged fly in the genus Ortalis of the family Ulidiidae.
