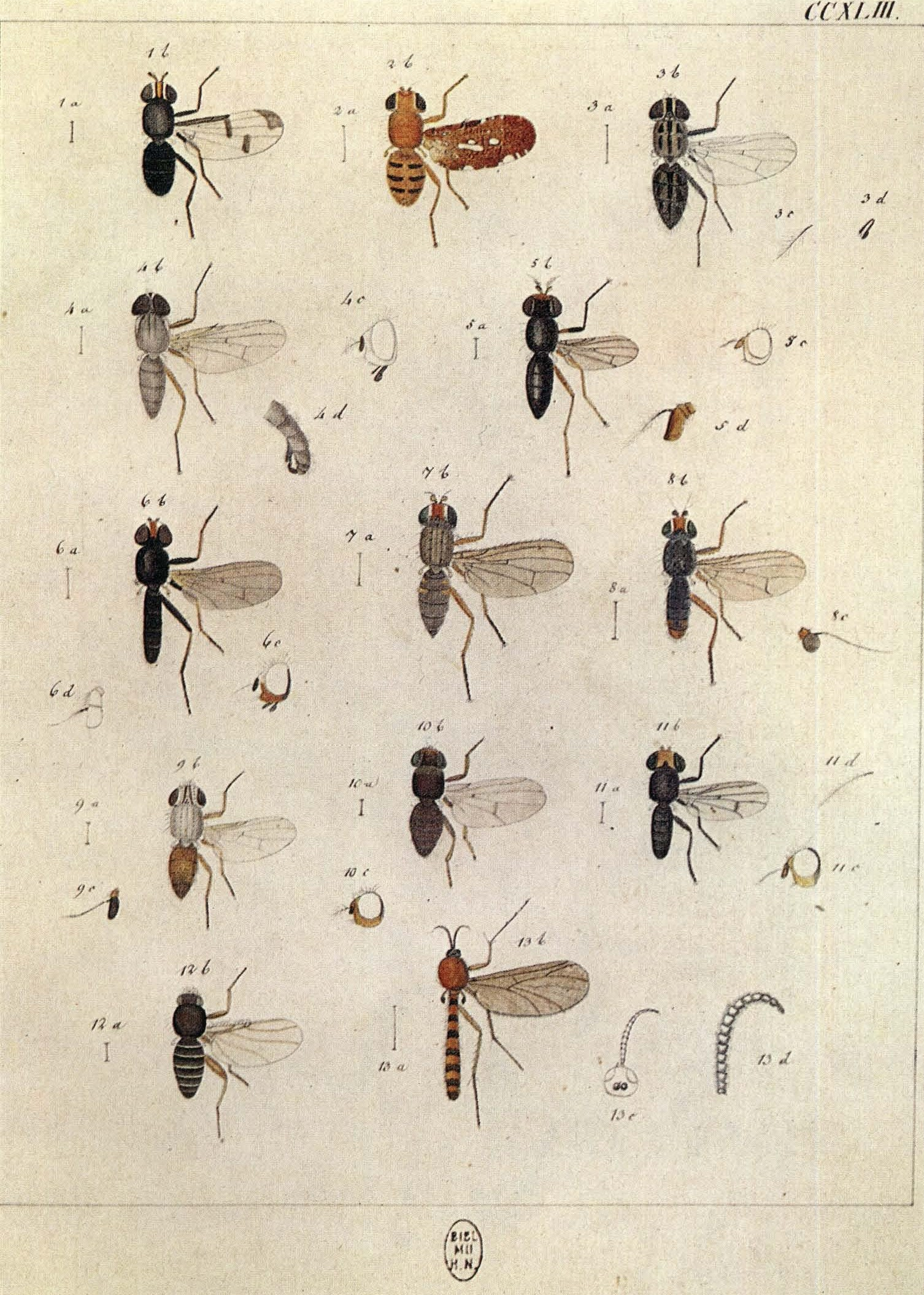

Scientific classification
- Kingdom: Animalia
- Phylum: Arthropoda
- Class: Insecta
- Order: Diptera
- Family: Ulidiidae
- Genus: Herina
- Species: H. germinationis

Binomial name
- Herina germinationis (Rossi, 1790)

Synonyms
- Herina luctuosa (Meigen, 1830); Herina moerens (Meigen, 1826); Herina nigrina (Meigen, 1826); Musca germinationis Rossi, 1790; Ortalis luctuosa Meigen, 1830; Ortalis moerens Meigen, 1826; Ortalis nigrina Meigen, 1826

= Herina germinationis =

Species of fly

Herina germinationis is a species of picture-winged fly in the genus Herina of the family Ulidiidae In the United Kingdom it is a species of dry calcareous grassland including coastal cliffs. It is about 5.0–5.5 millimetres (0.20–0.22 in) long. found in the United Kingdom and Switzerland.
