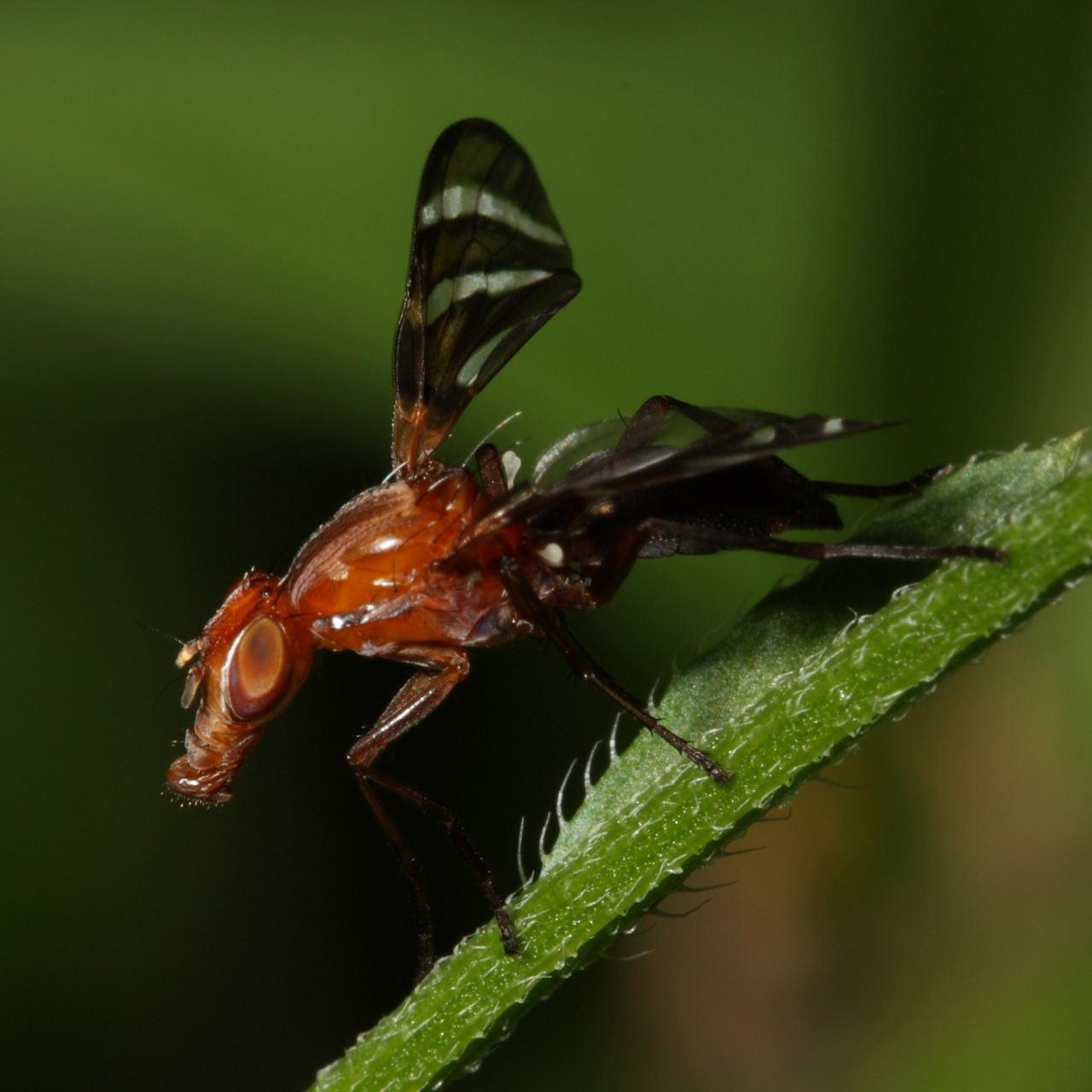

Scientific classification
- Kingdom: Animalia
- Phylum: Arthropoda
- Class: Insecta
- Order: Diptera
- Family: Ulidiidae
- Subfamily: Otitinae
- Tribe: Cephaliini
- Genus: Tritoxa
- Species: T. incurva

Binomial name
- Tritoxa incurva Loew, 1873

= Tritoxa incurva =

Species of fly

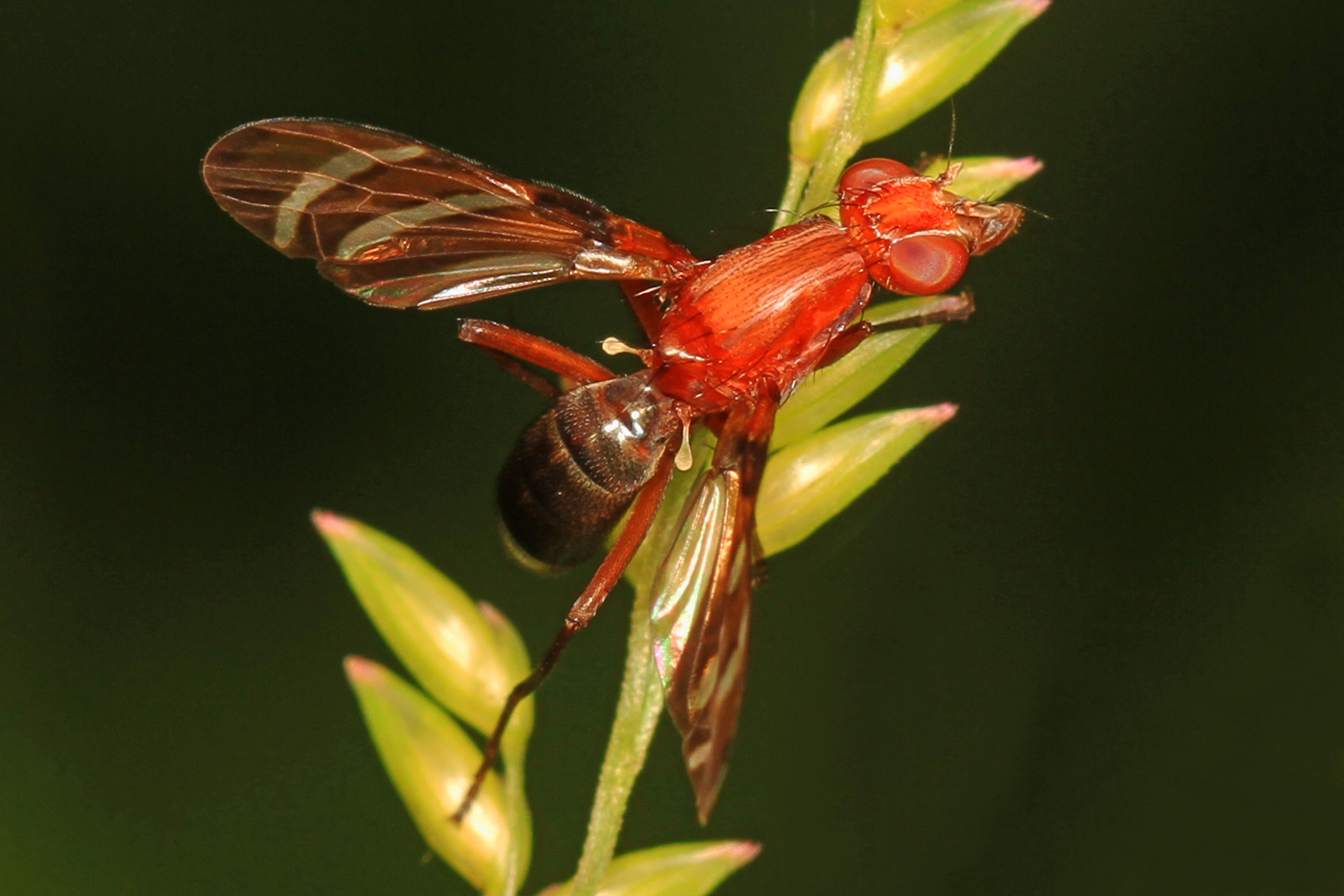
Tritoxa incurva in Merrimac Farm Wildlife Management Area, Aden, Virginia.

Tritoxa incurva is a species of picture-winged fly in the genus Tritoxa of the family Ulidiidae.

The flies are about 6–8 mm long. They have a bold wing pattern and rusty-brown coloration, at least in the east. They live in the eastern United States, and can be found in grassy meadows from May through October.

== Bibliography ==
1. Insects: Their Natural History And Diversity: With a Photographic Guide to Insects of Eastern North America; Stephen A. Marshall. 2006. Firefly Books Ltd.; See color photograph-496.6
2. Insects of North Carolina; C.S. Brimley. 1938. North Carolina Department of Agriculture. p. 381
