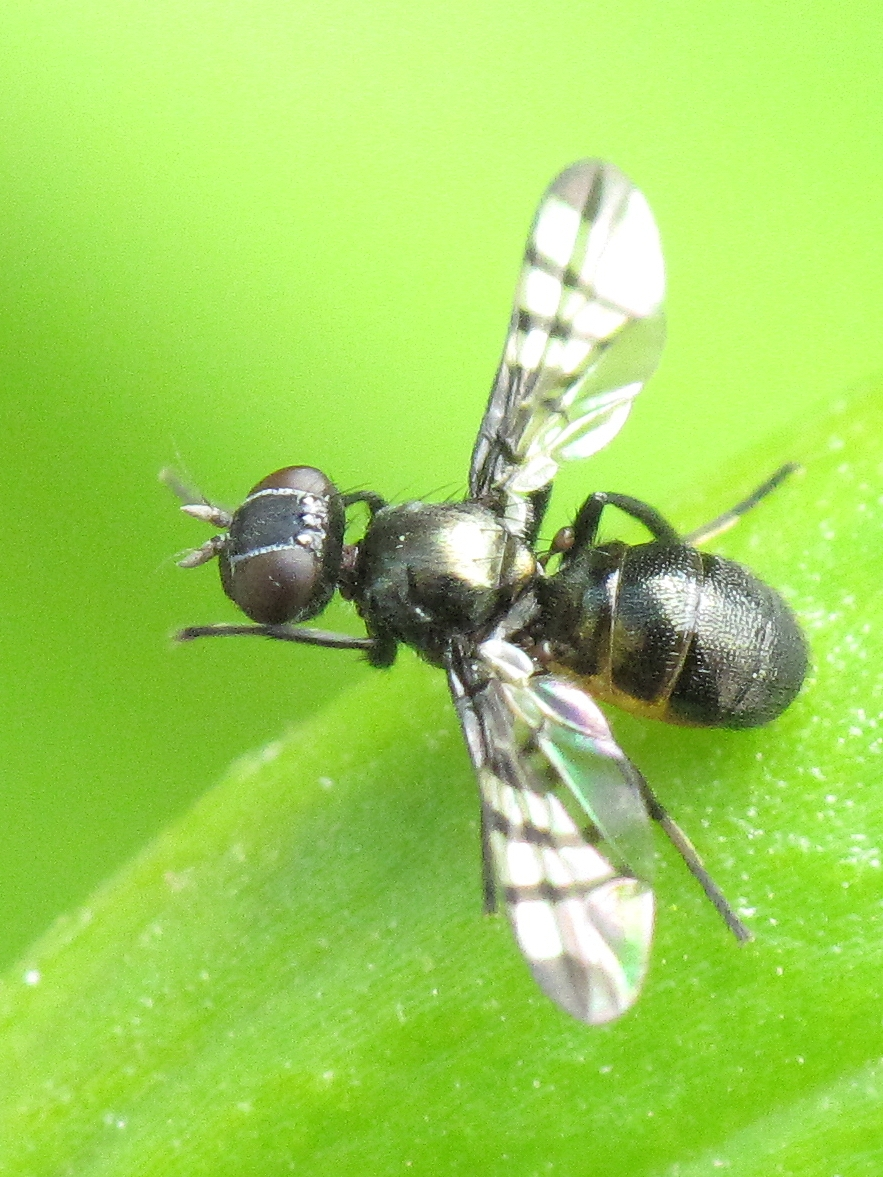
- Herina sp.

Scientific classification
- Kingdom: Animalia
- Phylum: Arthropoda
- Clade: Pancrustacea
- Class: Insecta
- Order: Diptera
- Family: Ulidiidae
- Subfamily: Otitinae
- Tribe: Otitini
- Genus: Herina; Robineau-Desvoidy, 1830

Type species
- Herina liturata Robineau-Desvoidy, 1830

= Herina (fly) =

Genus of flies

Herina is a genus of flies in the family Ulidiidae. It is possibly the largest genus in the family.

It is a genus of distinctive, small to medium-sized, dark species about 3.5-5.5 mm long, with patterned wings. The head is variably yellowish, reddish, or darkened, whilst the body is either shining black or black dusted with grey. Many are found in marshland or calcareous grassland locations and in coastal wetlands.

== Species ==
Species include:

- Herina aartseni Merz, 2002
- Herina flavoscutellata Becker, 1900
- Herina frondescentiae (Linnaeus, 1758)
- Herina germinationis (Rossi, 1790)
- Herina ghilianii Rondani, 1869
- Herina gyrans (Loew, 1864)
- Herina lacustris (Meigen, 1826)
- Herina liturata Robineau-Desvoidy, 1830
- Herina lugubris (Meigen, 1826)
- Herina merzi Kameneva, 2007
- Herina nigrina (Meigen, 1826)
- Herina oscillans (Meigen, 1826)
- Herina paludum (Fallén, 1820)
- Herina palustris (Meigen, 1826)
- Herina parva (Loew, 1864)
- Herina pseudoluctuosa Hennig, 1939
- Herina rivosecchii Merz, 2002
- Herina scutellaris Robineau-Desvoidy, 1830
- Herina tristis (Meigen, 1826)
- Herina yunnanica Kamaneva, 2006
