= O. formosa =

O. formosa may refer to:

- Olindias formosa, a western Pacific jellyfish
- Otites formosa, a picture-winged fly
- Oxycera formosa, a soldier fly
