= Meckelia philadelphica =

Scientific classification
- Kingdom: Animalia
- Phylum: Arthropoda
- Class: Insecta
- Order: Diptera
- Family: Ulidiidae
- Genus: Otites
- Species: O. philadelphica

Binomial name
- Otites philadelphica

Species of fly

Meckelia philadelphica is a species of ulidiid or picture-winged fly in the genus Meckelia of the family Tephritidae.
