= Pseudomelieria argentina =

Scientific classification
- Kingdom: Animalia
- Phylum: Arthropoda
- Class: Insecta
- Order: Diptera
- Family: Ulidiidae
- Genus: Pseudomelieria
- Species: P. argentina

Binomial name
- Pseudomelieria argentina Brèthes, 1922

Species of fly

Pseudomelieria argentina is a species of fly in the genus Pseudomelieria of the family Ulidiidae.
