= Herina ghilianii =

Scientific classification
- Kingdom: Animalia
- Phylum: Arthropoda
- Class: Insecta
- Order: Diptera
- Family: Ulidiidae
- Genus: Herina
- Species: H. ghilianii

Binomial name
- Herina ghilianii Rondani, 1869

Species of fly

Herina ghilianii is a species of ulidiid or picture-winged fly in the genus Herina of the family Ulidiidae found in Italy, Malta, and Morocco.
