= Dorycera inornata =

Scientific classification
- Kingdom: Animalia
- Phylum: Arthropoda
- Class: Insecta
- Order: Diptera
- Family: Ulidiidae
- Genus: Dorycera
- Species: D. inornata

Binomial name
- Dorycera inornata Loew, 1864

Species of fly

Dorycera inornata is a species of picture-winged fly in the genus Dorycera of the family Ulidiidae found on Corsica.
