= Dorycera tuberculosa =

Scientific classification
- Kingdom: Animalia
- Phylum: Arthropoda
- Class: Insecta
- Order: Diptera
- Family: Ulidiidae
- Genus: Dorycera
- Species: D. tuberculosa

Binomial name
- Dorycera tuberculosa Hendel, 1908

Species of fly

Dorycera tuberculosa is a species of picture-winged fly in the genus Dorycera of the family Ulidiidae found in Greece.
