= Otites atripes =

Scientific classification
- Kingdom: Animalia
- Phylum: Arthropoda
- Class: Insecta
- Order: Diptera
- Family: Ulidiidae
- Genus: Otites
- Species: O. atripes

Binomial name
- Otites atripes Loew, 1858

Species of fly

Otites atripes is a species of picture-winged fly in the genus Otites of the family Ulidiidae.
