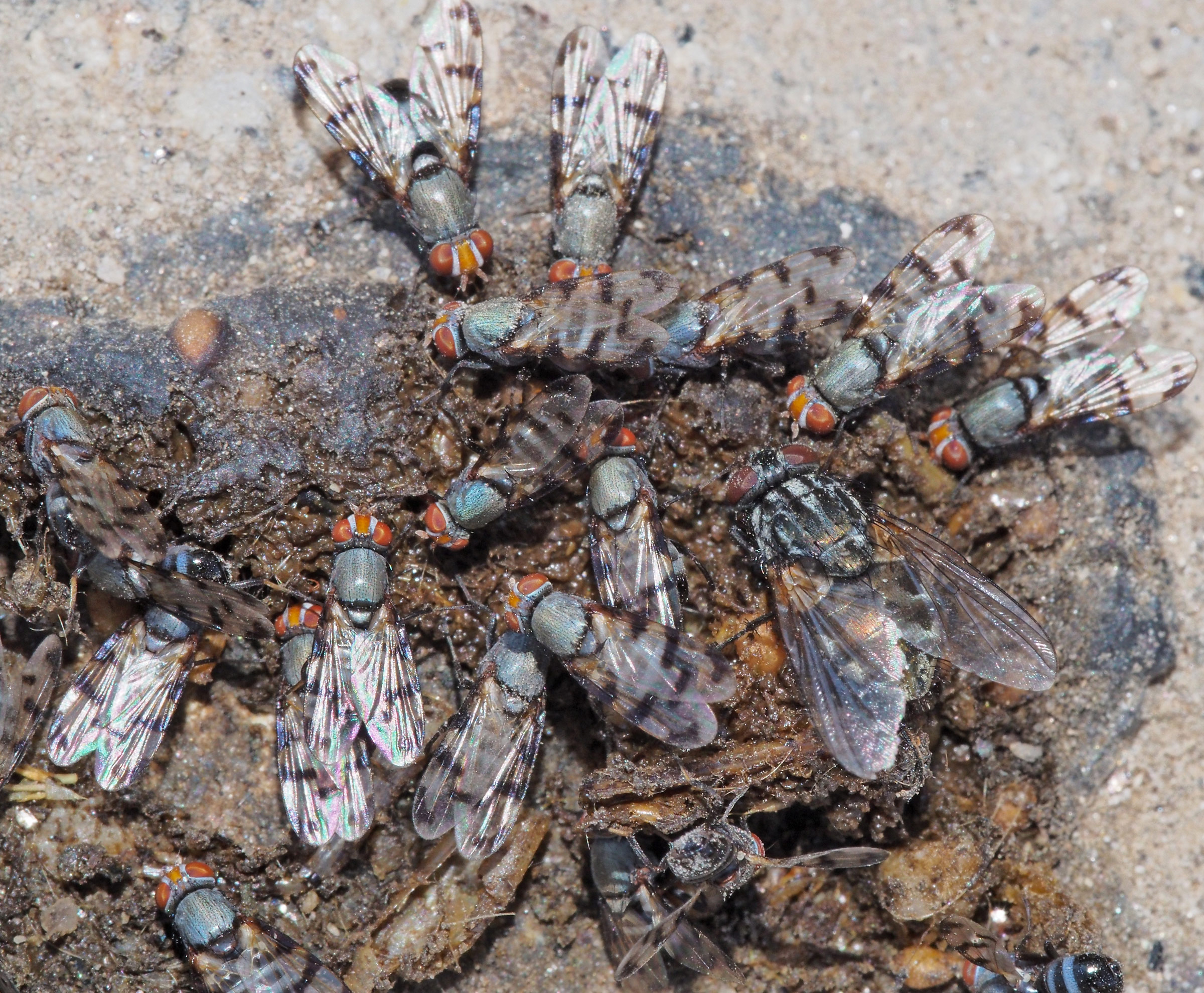

Scientific classification
- Kingdom: Animalia
- Phylum: Arthropoda
- Class: Insecta
- Order: Diptera
- Family: Ulidiidae
- Genus: Herina
- Species: H. gyrans

Binomial name
- Herina gyrans (Loew, 1864)

Synonyms
- Ortalis gyrans Loew, 1864; Anacampta unimaculata Czerny, 1909; Ceroxys unimaculata Hennig, 1939

= Herina gyrans =

Species of fly

Herina gyrans is a species of ulidiid or picture-winged fly in the genus Herina of the family Ulidiidae found in Croatia, Spain, and Algeria.
