= Hiatus fulvipes =

Scientific classification
- Kingdom: Animalia
- Phylum: Arthropoda
- Clade: Pancrustacea
- Class: Insecta
- Order: Diptera
- Family: Ulidiidae
- Subfamily: Otitinae
- Tribe: Otitini
- Genus: Hiatus; Cresson, 1906
- Species: H. fulvipes

Binomial name
- Hiatus fulvipes Cresson, 1906

Species of fly

Hiatus fulvipes is a species of ulidiid or picture-winged fly of the family Ulidiidae, the only species of the genus Hiatus.
