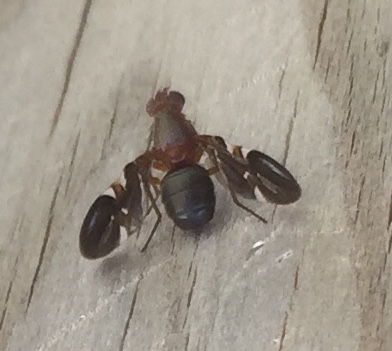

Scientific classification
- Kingdom: Animalia
- Phylum: Arthropoda
- Clade: Pancrustacea
- Class: Insecta
- Order: Diptera
- Family: Ulidiidae
- Subfamily: Otitinae
- Tribe: Cephaliini
- Genus: Delphinia; Robineau-Desvoidy, 1830
- Species: D. picta

Binomial name
- Delphinia picta (Fabricius, 1781)

Synonyms
- Camptoneura picta Fabricius; Delphinia thoracica Robineau-Desvoidy, 1830; Musca picta Fabricius, 1781; Tephritis conica Fabricius, 1805; Urophora nigriventris Macquart, 1855

= Delphinia picta =

Species of picture-winged fly in the family Ulidiidae

Delphinia picta is a species of picture-winged fly in the family Ulidiidae. The specific name picta is from Latin and means "painted". It is the only species in the monospecific genus Delphinia. It is found in the United States on the East Coast and in the Midwest from Florida to Maine across to Kansas through Minnesota but also can be found in Mexico and El Salvador. It is sometimes mistaken for a species of fruit fly, but D. picta do not feed on living plant matter, as they are detritivores and eat decaying plant matter. They also have been observed eating fermenting frass from Megacyllene robiniae on black locust trees. They can be found almost anywhere there is decaying vegetation: landfills, temperate deciduous forests, swamps, and even shaded fields.

== Description ==
The best way to identify the species is by the distinct pattern on its wings, which are shiny and dark brown with a hyaline background. Its body is about 7mm long with a black abdomen and a light brown head, thorax, and legs. The ovipositor averages 1.27mm long with two dorsal and one ventral prominent pairs of setae, as well as many short setae on both sides. The tip of the ovipositor also has a slight bend downward.

== Life cycle ==
Adults raised in the lab usually live less than 40 days, but can live up to 69 days. Mating takes place in the evening two days after emergence from pupae. The female will wave her wings gently and a male will respond by flicking his wings before copulation. Courtship may also include one or both of the partners blowing a bubble from their mouth. Females will lay up to 500 eggs in decaying herbaceous plant matter, which then hatch into larvae in 4 to 6 days. Larvae develop through three instar stages and reach pupae in 21–30 days then finish pupating 14–17 days later. The development is affected by the amount of daylight: D. picta is a multivoltine species with one generation going from May to July and the other overwintering as mature larvae.

== Ecology ==
Among the plants it associates with are black locust (Robinia pseudoacacia), eastern cottonwood (Populus deltoides), and saw palmetto (Serenoa repens). It is prey for wasps, such as Crabro monticola.

== Gallery ==
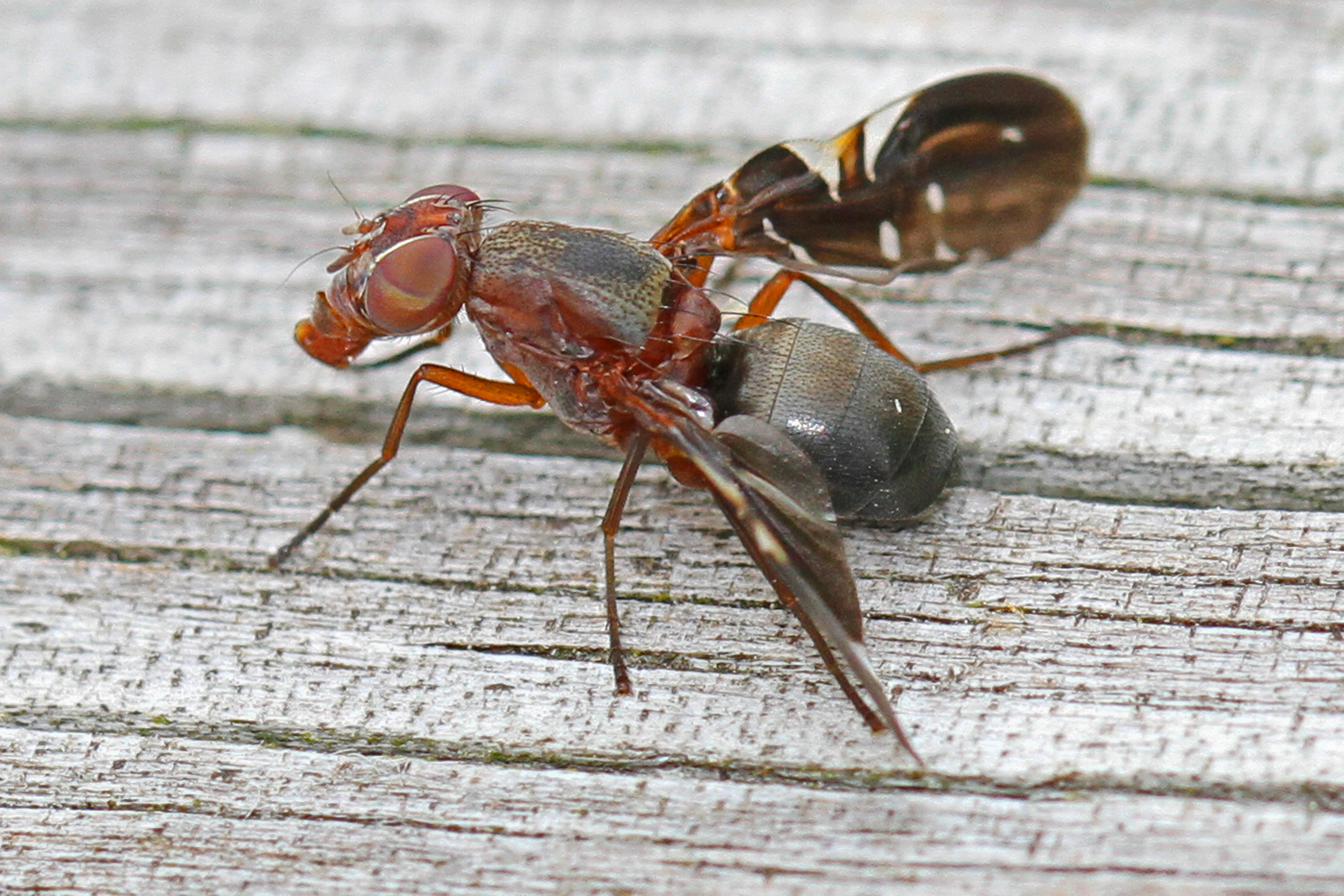

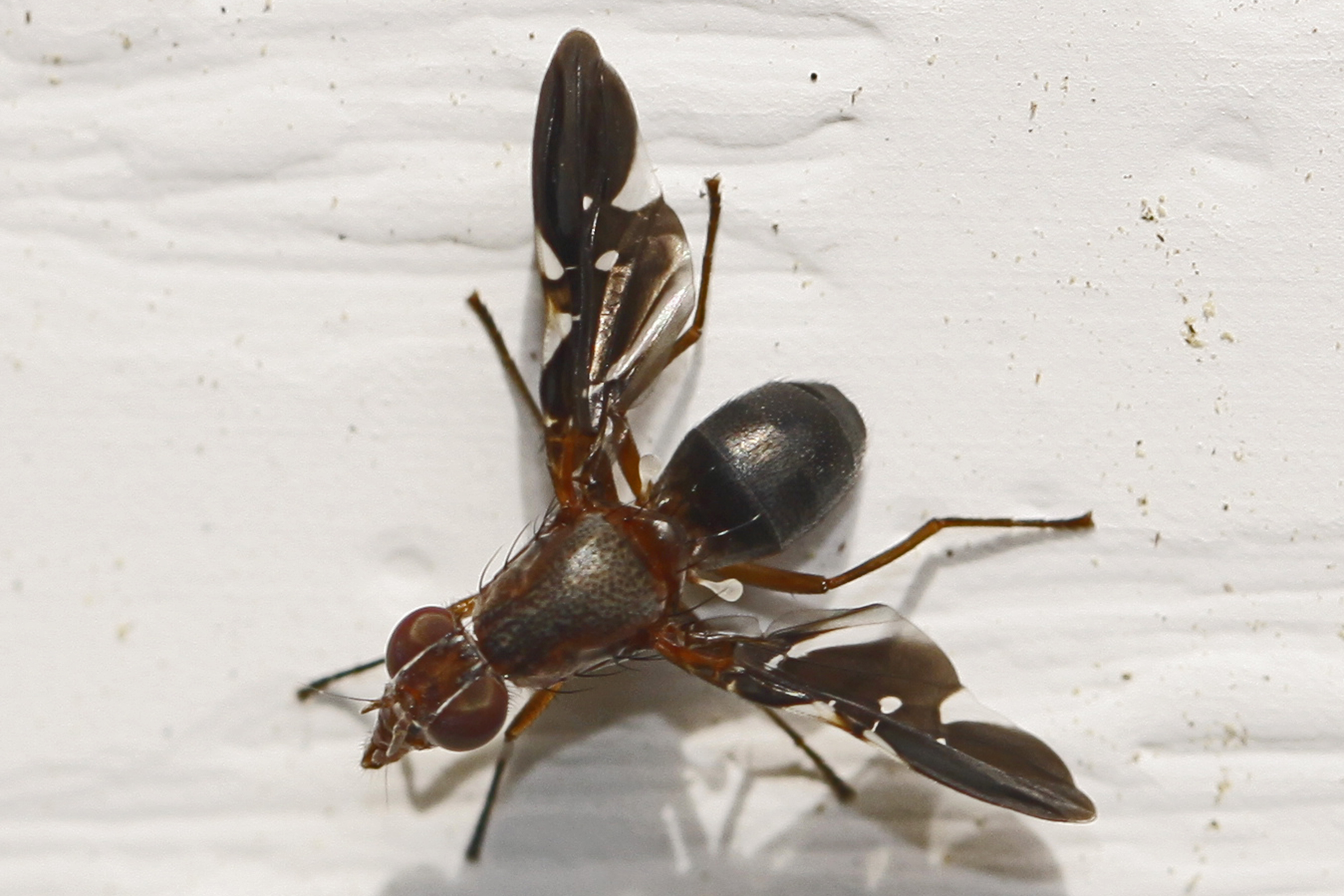

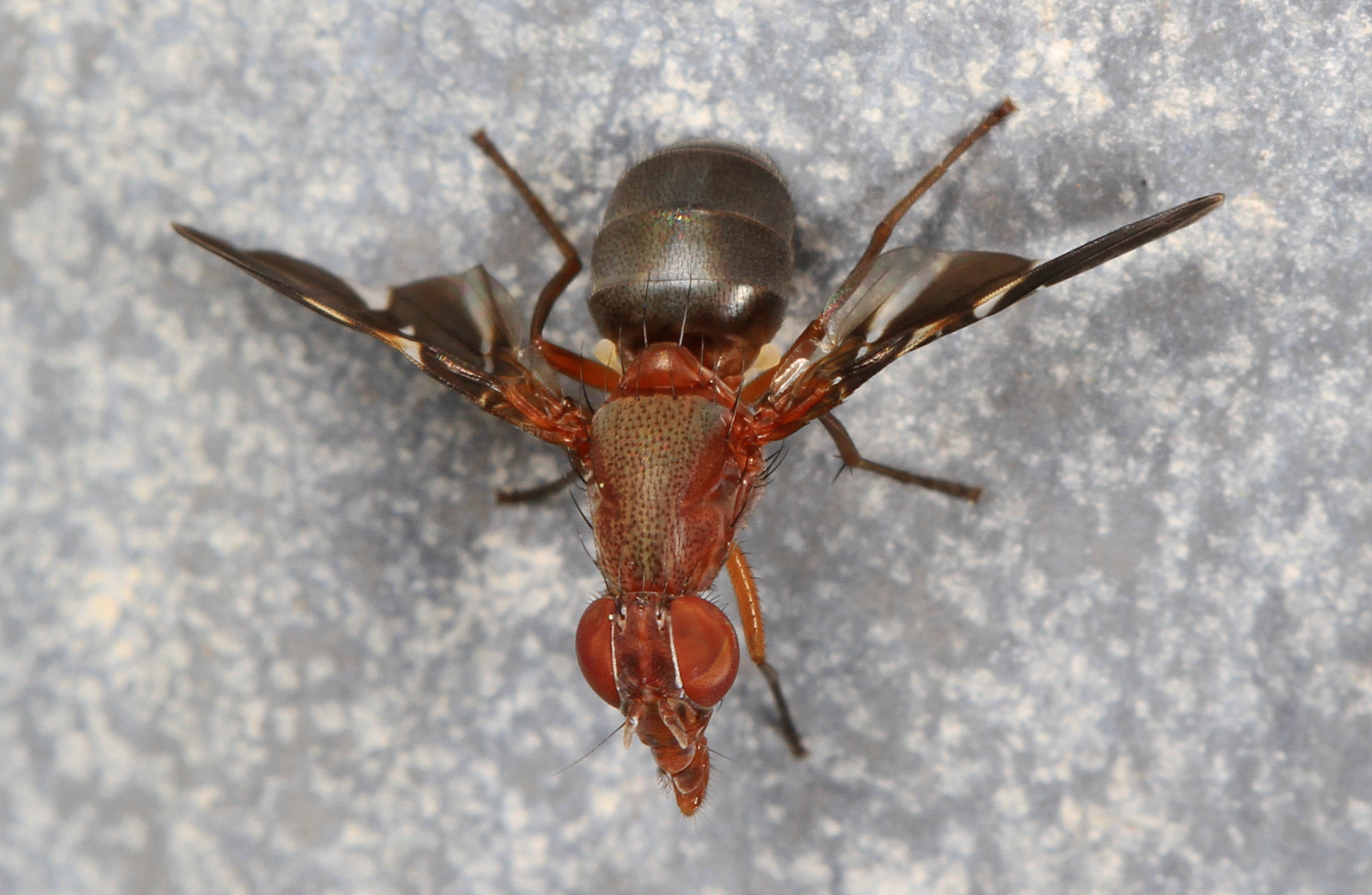

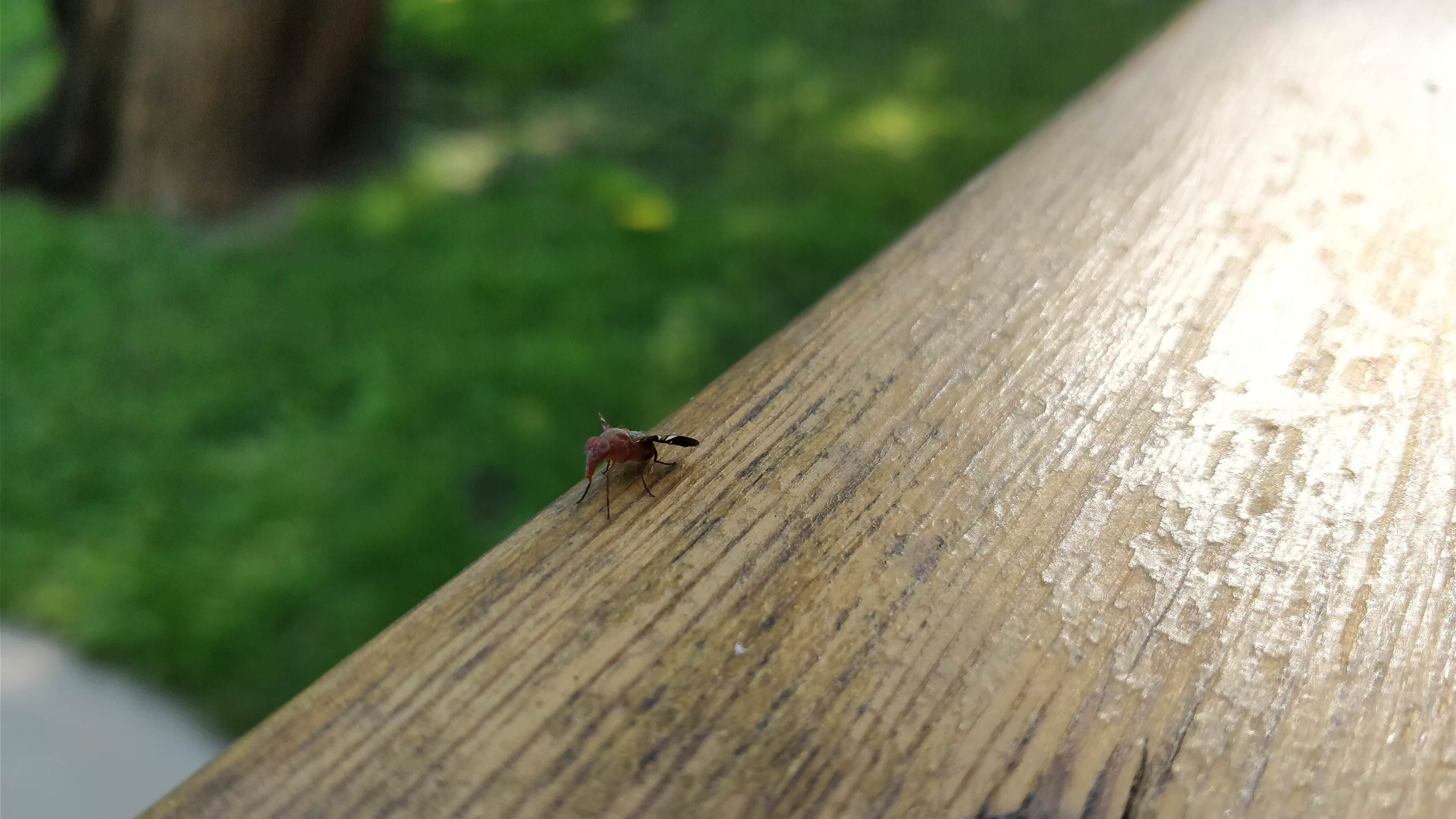
