= Dorycera caucasica =

Scientific classification
- Kingdom: Animalia
- Phylum: Arthropoda
- Clade: Pancrustacea
- Class: Insecta
- Order: Diptera
- Family: Ulidiidae
- Genus: Dorycera
- Species: D. caucasica

Binomial name
- Dorycera caucasica Hendel, 1910

Species of fly

Dorycera caucasica is a species of ulidiid or picture-winged fly in the genus Dorycera of the family Ulidiidae.
