= Dorycera hybrida =

Scientific classification
- Kingdom: Animalia
- Phylum: Arthropoda
- Class: Insecta
- Order: Diptera
- Family: Ulidiidae
- Genus: Dorycera
- Species: D. hybrida

Binomial name
- Dorycera hybrida Loew, 1862

Species of fly

Dorycera hybrida is a species of picture-winged fly in the genus Dorycera of the family Ulidiidae found in France, Ukraine, Greece, and Turkey.
