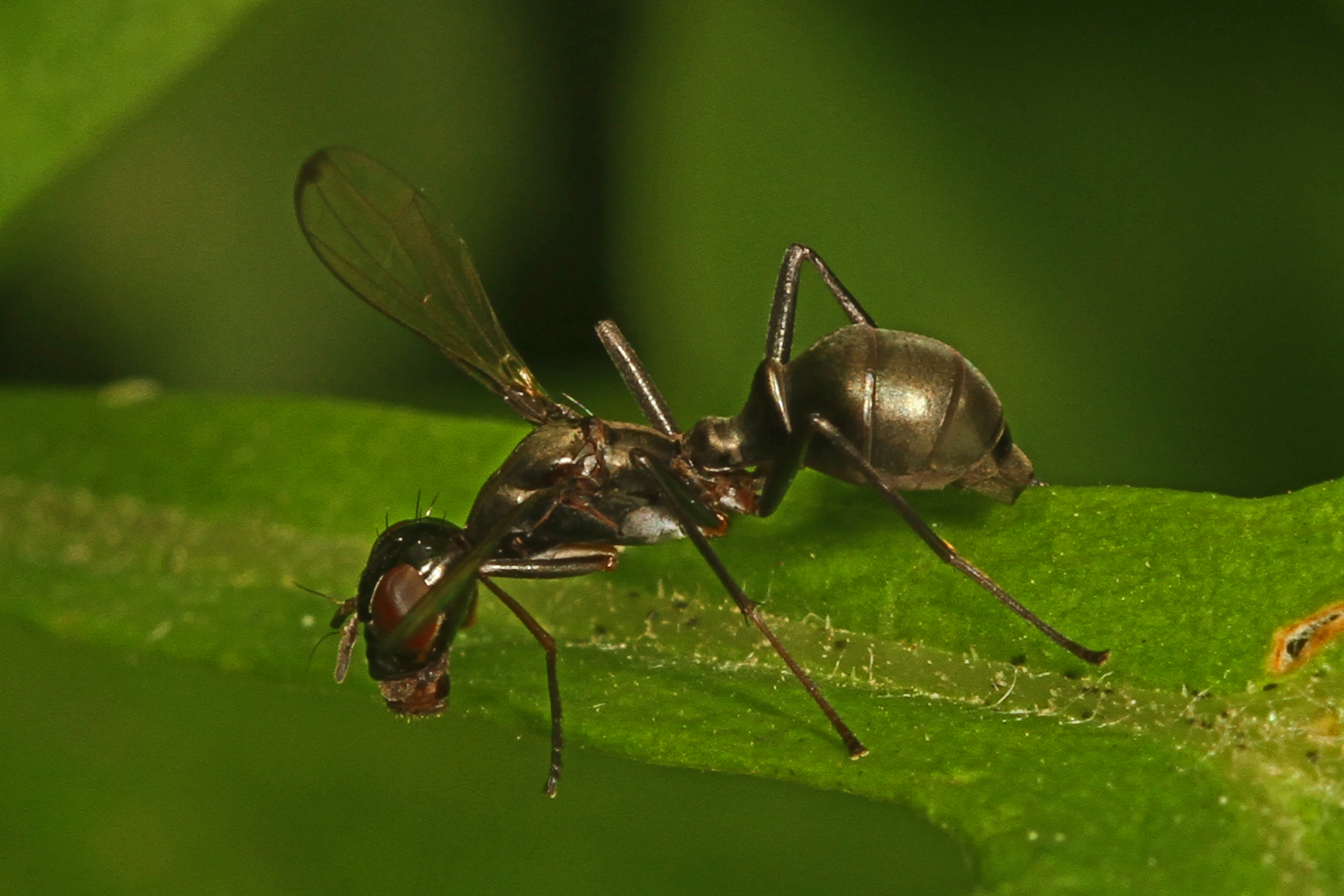
- Myrmecothea myrmecoides

Scientific classification
- Kingdom: Animalia
- Phylum: Arthropoda
- Class: Insecta
- Order: Diptera
- Family: Ulidiidae
- Subfamily: Otitinae
- Tribe: Cephaliini
- Genus: Myrmecothea; Hendel, 1910

Type species
- Cephalia myrmecoides Loew, 1860

= Myrmecothea =

Genus of flies

Myrmecothea is a genus of picture-winged flies in the family Ulidiidae.

== Species ==
- Myrmecothea myrmecoides (Loew, 1860)
