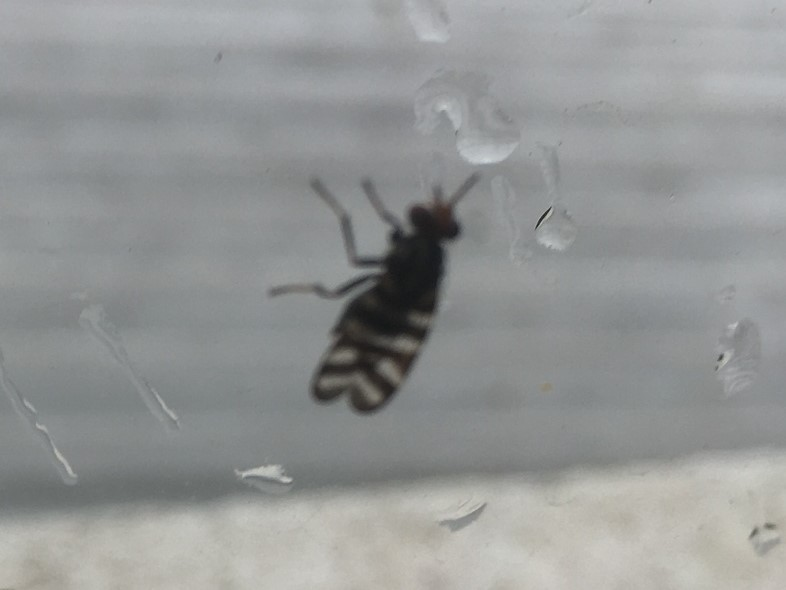
- Pterotaenia fasciata

Scientific classification
- Kingdom: Animalia
- Phylum: Arthropoda
- Class: Insecta
- Order: Diptera
- Family: Ulidiidae
- Subfamily: Otitinae
- Tribe: Cephaliini
- Genus: Pterotaenia; Rondani, 1868

Type species
- Ortalis fasciata Wiedemann, 1830

Synonyms
- Platyeuxesta Blanchard, 1967

= Pterotaenia =

Genus of flies

Pterotaenia is a genus of picture-winged flies in the family Ulidiidae.

== Species ==
- Pterotaenia angustifasciata Malloch, 1933
- Pterotaenia edwardsi Malloch, 1933
- Pterotaenia fasciata (Wiedemann, 1830)
- Pterotaenia peruana Malloch, 1933
- Pterotaenia rivelloides (Blanchard, 1967)
