= Otites gradualis =

Scientific classification
- Kingdom: Animalia
- Phylum: Arthropoda
- Class: Insecta
- Order: Diptera
- Family: Ulidiidae
- Genus: Otites
- Species: O. gradualis

Binomial name
- Otites gradualis Carles-Tolra, 1998

Species of fly

Otites gradualis is a species of ulidiid or picture-winged fly in the genus Otites of the family Ulidiidae.
