= Dorycera grandis =

Scientific classification
- Kingdom: Animalia
- Phylum: Arthropoda
- Class: Insecta
- Order: Diptera
- Family: Ulidiidae
- Genus: Dorycera
- Species: D. grandis

Binomial name
- Dorycera grandis (Rondani, 1869)

Synonyms
- Macheirocera grandis Rondani, 1869

Species of fly

Dorycera grandis is a species of picture-winged fly in the genus Dorycera of the family Ulidiidae. found in France, Italy, and Spain.
