= Herina merzi =

Scientific classification
- Kingdom: Animalia
- Phylum: Arthropoda
- Class: Insecta
- Order: Diptera
- Family: Ulidiidae
- Genus: Herina
- Species: H. merzi

Binomial name
- Herina merzi Kameneva, 2007

Species of fly

Herina merzi is a species of picture-winged fly known only from Merishausen in the canton of Schaffhausen, Switzerland. It is a mostly dark-coloured insect with shining-black abdomen and brownish-black thorax and legs. The head is more colourful with a reddish-yellow frons. The wings are marked with three incomplete dark cross-bands and an isolated dark spot.

This insect, first found in 2001, surprisingly, appears to be more closely related to congeners from the Indomalayan realm rather than other European species. The location of the type locality, far from airports and major cities, suggests accidental introduction is unlikely. The specific name merzi is in honour of the entomologist Bernhard Merz.
