= Otites michiganus =

Scientific classification
- Kingdom: Animalia
- Phylum: Arthropoda
- Class: Insecta
- Order: Diptera
- Family: Ulidiidae
- Genus: Otites
- Species: O. michiganus

Binomial name
- Otites michiganus Steyskal, 1966

Species of fly

Otites michiganus is a species of ulidiid or picture-winged fly in the genus Otites of the family Ulidiidae.
