= Fenestrata (disambiguation) =

Fenestrata is an extinct order of bryozoan.

Fenestrata may also refer to:

- C. fenestrata (disambiguation)
- Lucina fenestrata, Hinds, 1845, a bivalve species in the genus Lucina and the family Lucinidae
- Umbonium fenestrata, T. Kuroda, a sea snail species in the genus Umbonium
- Vieja fenestrata, Günther, 1860, a fish species in the genus Vieja
