= Herina oscillans =

Scientific classification
- Kingdom: Animalia
- Phylum: Arthropoda
- Class: Insecta
- Order: Diptera
- Family: Ulidiidae
- Genus: Herina
- Species: H. oscillans

Binomial name
- Herina oscillans (Meigen, 1826)

Synonyms
- Ortalis oscillans Meigen, 1826; Ortalis apicalis Zetterstedt, 1849

Species of fly

Herina oscillans is a species of picture-winged fly in the genus Herina of the family Ulidiidae found in most of Western Europe.
