= Herina aartseni =

Scientific classification
- Kingdom: Animalia
- Phylum: Arthropoda
- Class: Insecta
- Order: Diptera
- Family: Ulidiidae
- Genus: Herina
- Species: H. aartseni

Binomial name
- Herina aartseni Merz, 2002

Species of fly

Herina aartseni is a species of picture-winged fly in the genus Herina of the family Ulidiidae.
