= Dorycera graminum =

Scientific classification
- Kingdom: Animalia
- Phylum: Arthropoda
- Class: Insecta
- Order: Diptera
- Family: Ulidiidae
- Genus: Dorycera
- Species: D. graminum

Binomial name
- Dorycera graminum (Fabricius, 1794)

Synonyms
- Dorycera aquatica (Geoffroy, 1785); Musca aquatica Geoffroy, 1785; Musca graminum Fabricius, 1794

Species of fly

Dorycera graminum is a species of picture-winged fly in the genus Dorycera of the family Ulidiidae found in Croatia, Corsica, the United Kingdom, Austria, Germany, Italy, Hungary, Poland, Portugal, Slovakia, and Spain.
