= Otites erythrosceles =

Scientific classification
- Kingdom: Animalia
- Phylum: Arthropoda
- Class: Insecta
- Order: Diptera
- Family: Ulidiidae
- Genus: Otites
- Species: O. erythrosceles

Binomial name
- Otites erythrosceles Steyskal, 1966

Species of fly

Otites erythrosceles is a species of ulidiid or picture-winged fly in the genus Otites of the family Ulidiidae.
