= Heramya populicola =

Scientific classification
- Kingdom: Animalia
- Phylum: Arthropoda
- Class: Insecta
- Order: Diptera
- Family: Ulidiidae
- Genus: Heramyia
- Species: H. populicola

Binomial name
- Heramya populicola Robineau-Desvoidy, 1830

Species of fly

Heramya populicola is a species of ulidiid or picture-winged fly in the genus Heramya of the family Ulidiidae.
