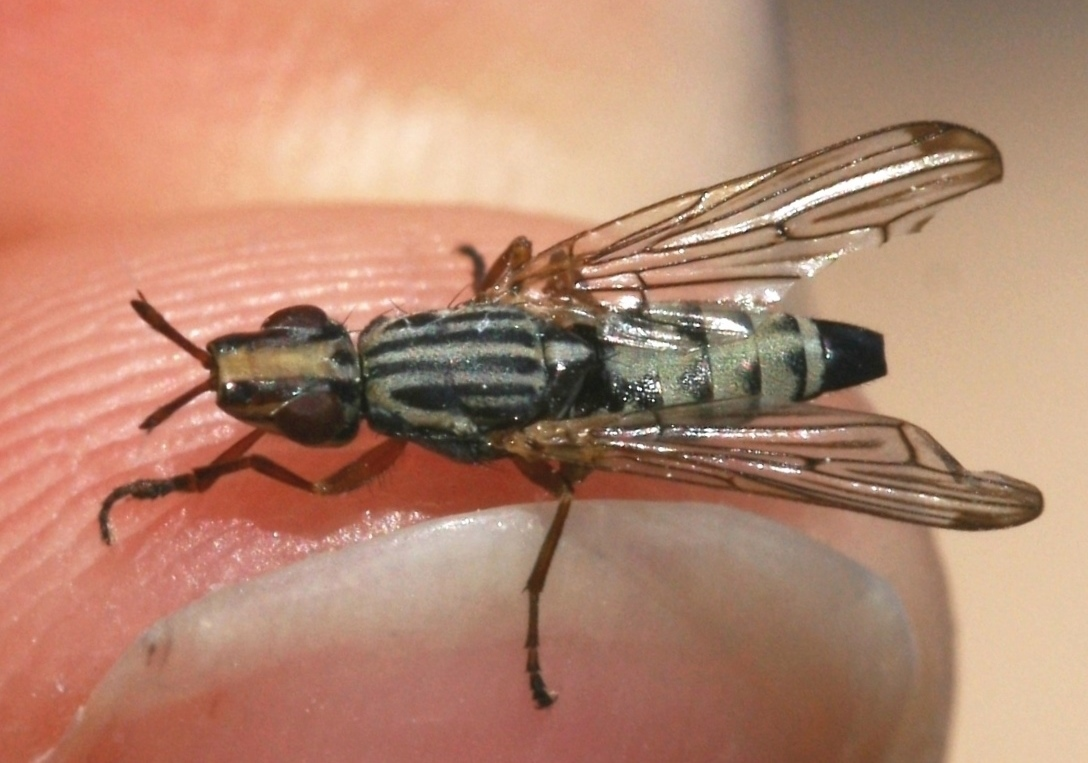

Scientific classification
- Kingdom: Animalia
- Phylum: Arthropoda
- Clade: Pancrustacea
- Class: Insecta
- Order: Diptera
- Family: Ulidiidae
- Subfamily: Otitinae
- Tribe: Otitini
- Genus: Dorycera; Meigen, 1830

Synonyms
- Driope Swinderen, 1822 (nomen oblitum); Macheirocera Rondani, 1869; Percnomatia Loew, 1868

= Dorycera =

Genus of flies

Dorycera is a genus of picture-winged flies in the family Ulidiidae.

== Species ==
- Dorycera aquatica (Geoffroy, 1785)
- Dorycera brevis Loew, 1868
- Dorycera caucasica Hendel, 1910
- Dorycera graminum (Fabricius, 1794)
- Dorycera grandis (Rondani, 1869)
- Dorycera griseipennis (Becker, 1907)
- Dorycera hybrida Loew, 1862
- Dorycera inornata Loew, 1864
- Dorycera judea Hendel, 1908
- Dorycera longiceps Hennig, 1939
- Dorycera maculipennis Macquart, 1843
- Dorycera melanotica Hennig, 1939
- Dorycera nitida Hendel, 1910
- Dorycera persica Hennig, 1939
- Dorycera pictipennis Hennig, 1939
- Dorycera punctulata Ackerman, El Harym & Freidberg, 2023
- Dorycera scalaris Loew, 1868
- Dorycera syriaca Becker, 1910
- Dorycera thamnicola (Robineau-Desvoidy, 1830)
- Dorycera tuberculosa Hendel, 1908
