= Otites approximata =

Scientific classification
- Kingdom: Animalia
- Phylum: Arthropoda
- Clade: Pancrustacea
- Class: Insecta
- Order: Diptera
- Family: Ulidiidae
- Genus: Otites
- Species: O. approximata

Binomial name
- Otites approximata Hendel, 1911

Species of fly

Otites approximata is a species of picture-winged fly in the genus Otites of the family Ulidiidae.
