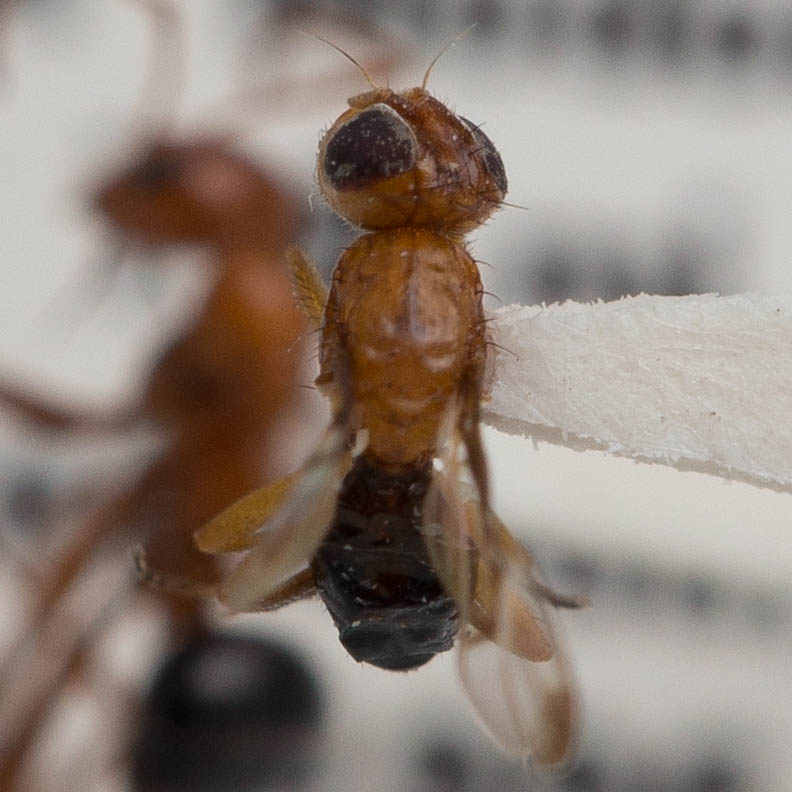

Scientific classification
- Kingdom: Animalia
- Phylum: Arthropoda
- Class: Insecta
- Order: Diptera
- Family: Ulidiidae
- Genus: Haigia
- Species: H. nevadana

Binomial name
- Haigia nevadana Steyskal, 1961

= Haigia nevadana =

Species of fly

Haigia nevadana is a species of ulidiid or picture-winged fly in the genus Haigia of the family Tephritidae.
