= Dorycera scalaris =

Scientific classification
- Kingdom: Animalia
- Phylum: Arthropoda
- Clade: Pancrustacea
- Class: Insecta
- Order: Diptera
- Family: Ulidiidae
- Genus: Dorycera
- Species: D. scalaris

Binomial name
- Dorycera scalaris Loew, 1868

Species of fly

Dorycera scalaris is a species of ulidiid or picture-winged fly in the genus Dorycera of the family Ulidiidae.
