= Otites ornata =

Scientific classification
- Kingdom: Animalia
- Phylum: Arthropoda
- Class: Insecta
- Order: Diptera
- Family: Ulidiidae
- Genus: Otites
- Species: O. ornata

Binomial name
- Otites ornata Meigen, 1826

Species of fly

Otites ornata is a species of picture-winged fly in the genus Otites of the family Ulidiidae.
