= Psaeropterella macrocephala =

Scientific classification
- Kingdom: Animalia
- Phylum: Arthropoda
- Class: Insecta
- Order: Diptera
- Family: Ulidiidae
- Genus: Psaeropterella
- Species: P. macrocephala

Binomial name
- Psaeropterella macrocephala Hendel, 1914

Species of fly

Psaeropterella macrocephala is a species of ulidiid or picture-winged fly in the genus Psaeropterella of the family Tephritidae.
