= Dorycera maculipennis =

Scientific classification
- Kingdom: Animalia
- Phylum: Arthropoda
- Class: Insecta
- Order: Diptera
- Family: Ulidiidae
- Genus: Dorycera
- Species: D. maculipennis

Binomial name
- Dorycera maculipennis Macquart, 1843

Species of fly

Dorycera maculipennis is a species of picture-winged fly in the genus Dorycera of the family Ulidiidae found in Cyprus, Greece, Italy, and Spain.
