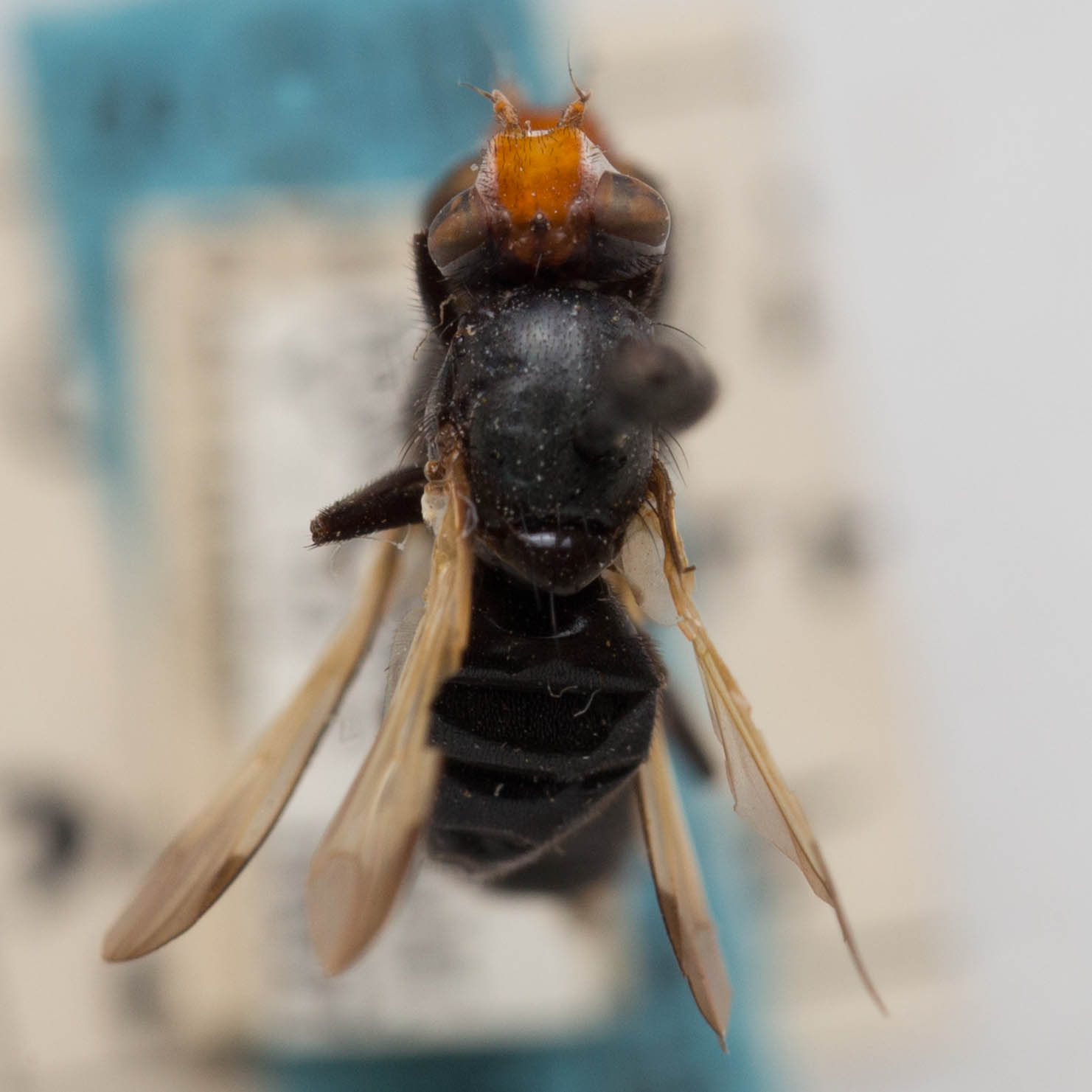

Scientific classification
- Kingdom: Animalia
- Phylum: Arthropoda
- Class: Insecta
- Order: Diptera
- Family: Ulidiidae
- Genus: Otites
- Species: O. pyrrhocephala

Binomial name
- Otites pyrrhocephala (Loew, 1876)

= Otites pyrrhocephala =

Species of fly

Otites pyrrhocephala is a species of ulidiid or picture-winged fly in the genus Otites of the family Ulidiidae.
