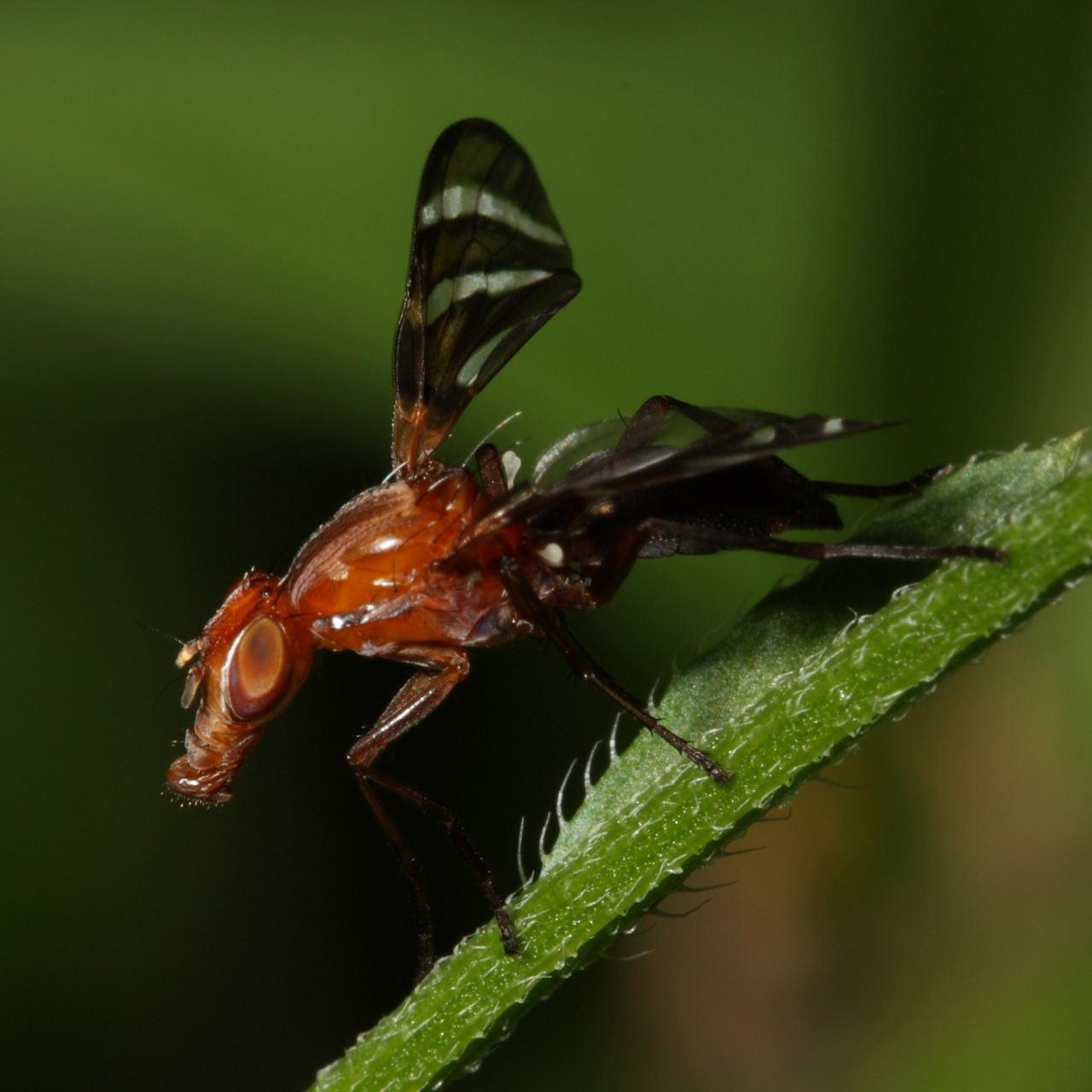
- Tritoxa incurva

Scientific classification
- Kingdom: Animalia
- Phylum: Arthropoda
- Class: Insecta
- Order: Diptera
- Family: Ulidiidae
- Subfamily: Otitinae
- Tribe: Cephaliini
- Genus: Tritoxa; Loew, 1873

Type species
- Trypeta flexa Wiedemann, 1830

= Tritoxa =

Genus of flies

Tritoxa is a genus of picture-winged flies in the family Ulidiidae.

== Species ==
- Tritoxa californica Sinclair, MacLeod & Wheeler, 2021
- Tritoxa cuneata Loew, 1873
- Tritoxa decipiens Sinclair, MacLeod & Wheeler, 2021
- Tritoxa flexa (Wiedemann, 1830)
- Tritoxa incurva Loew, 1873
- Tritoxa pollinosa Cole, 1919
- Tritoxa ra Harriot, 1942
