= Otites bradescui =

Scientific classification
- Kingdom: Animalia
- Phylum: Arthropoda
- Class: Insecta
- Order: Diptera
- Family: Ulidiidae
- Genus: Otites
- Species: O. bradescui

Binomial name
- Otites bradescui Gheorghiu, 1988

Species of fly

Otites bradescui is a species of ulidiid or picture-winged fly in the genus Otites of the family Ulidiidae.
