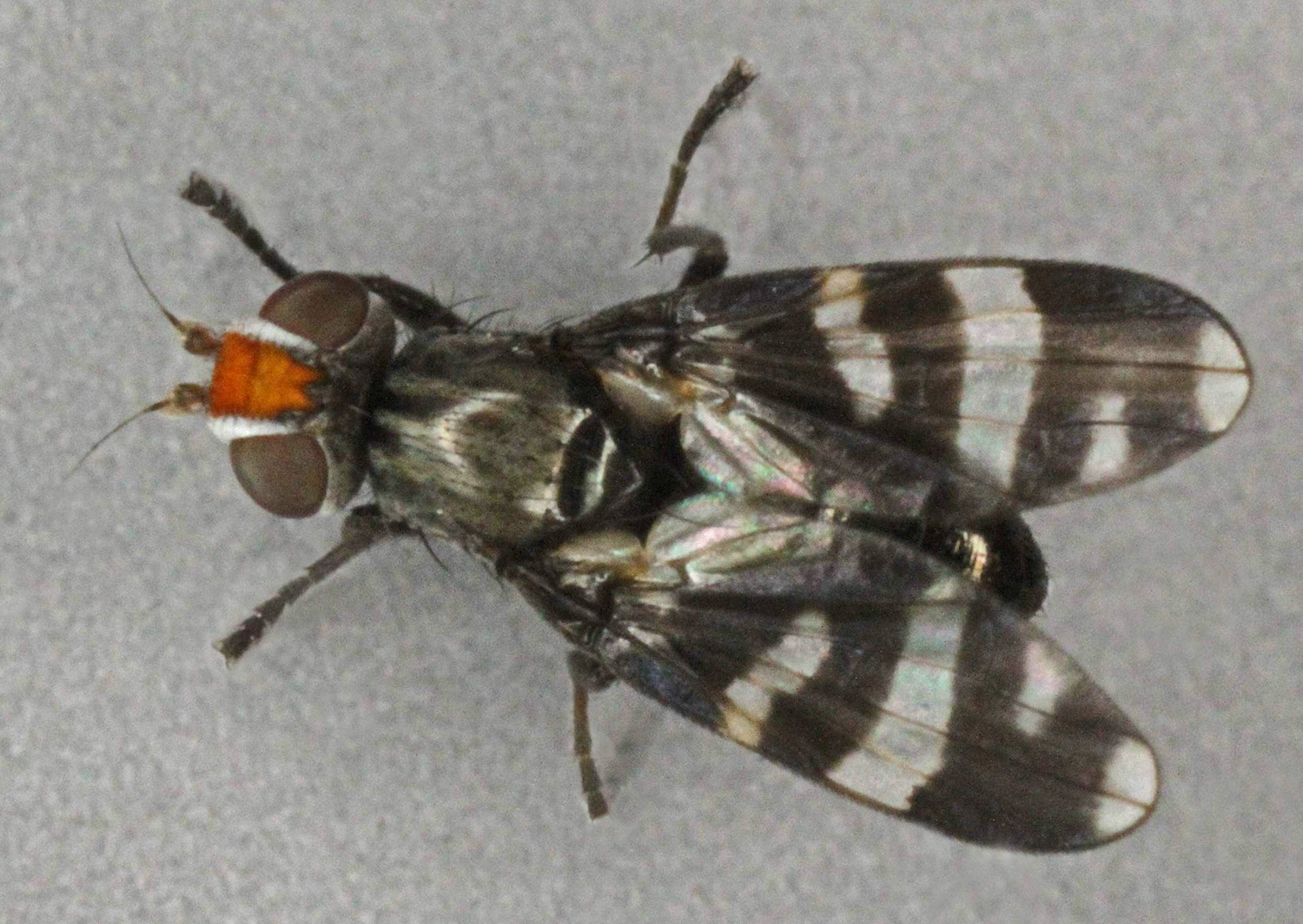
- Herina frondescentiae North Wales

Scientific classification
- Kingdom: Animalia
- Phylum: Arthropoda
- Class: Insecta
- Order: Diptera
- Family: Ulidiidae
- Genus: Herina
- Species: H. frondescentiae

Binomial name
- Herina frondescentiae (Linnaeus, 1758)

Synonyms
- Musca frondescentiae Linnaeus, 1758

= Herina frondescentiae =

Species of fly

Herina frondescentiae is a species of picture-winged fly in the genus Herina of the family Ulidiidae It is wetland species of about 3–4 millimetres (0.12–0.16 in) in length. found in Sweden, Finland, Denmark, Latvia, the United Kingdom, Ireland, France, Netherlands, Germany, Spain, Andorra, Italy, Hungary, Romania, Albania, Ukraine, Croatia, Estonia, Poland, Lithuania, the Czech Republic, Slovakia, and Switzerland.

This fly is characterized by a pattern on the wings consisting of four transverse stripes, fused together to form a shape similar to "U" and "M". Females have at most 3.5 times longer than wide eighth tergosternite and oval abdominal bracts . Their spermatheca is characterized by an oblong-oval shape. The reproductive organs of males are distinguished by surstyles bent in the middle, each of which is equipped with three prensisetae set in the middle and two sets in the middle-base part.
