= Dorycera brevis =

Scientific classification
- Kingdom: Animalia
- Phylum: Arthropoda
- Class: Insecta
- Order: Diptera
- Family: Ulidiidae
- Genus: Dorycera
- Species: D. brevis

Binomial name
- Dorycera brevis Loew, 1868

Species of fly

Dorycera brevis is a species of picture-winged fly in the genus Dorycera of the family Ulidiidae found in Greece.
