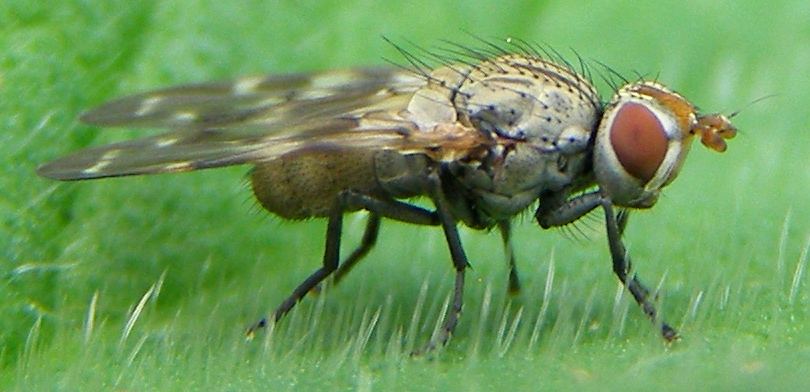

Scientific classification
- Kingdom: Animalia
- Phylum: Arthropoda
- Clade: Pancrustacea
- Class: Insecta
- Order: Diptera
- Family: Ulidiidae
- Genus: Otites
- Species: O. guttata

Binomial name
- Otites guttata (Meigen, 1830)

Synonyms
- Ortalis guttata Meigen, 1830; Myoris silvatica Robineau-Desvoidy, 1830

= Otites guttata =

Species of fly

Otites guttata is a species of picture-winged fly in the family Ulidiidae. This species was originally described as Ortalis guttata, but that name is now used for the speckled chachalaca, a species of bird.

== Distribution ==
Otites guttata is widely distributed in southern and southeastern Europe.

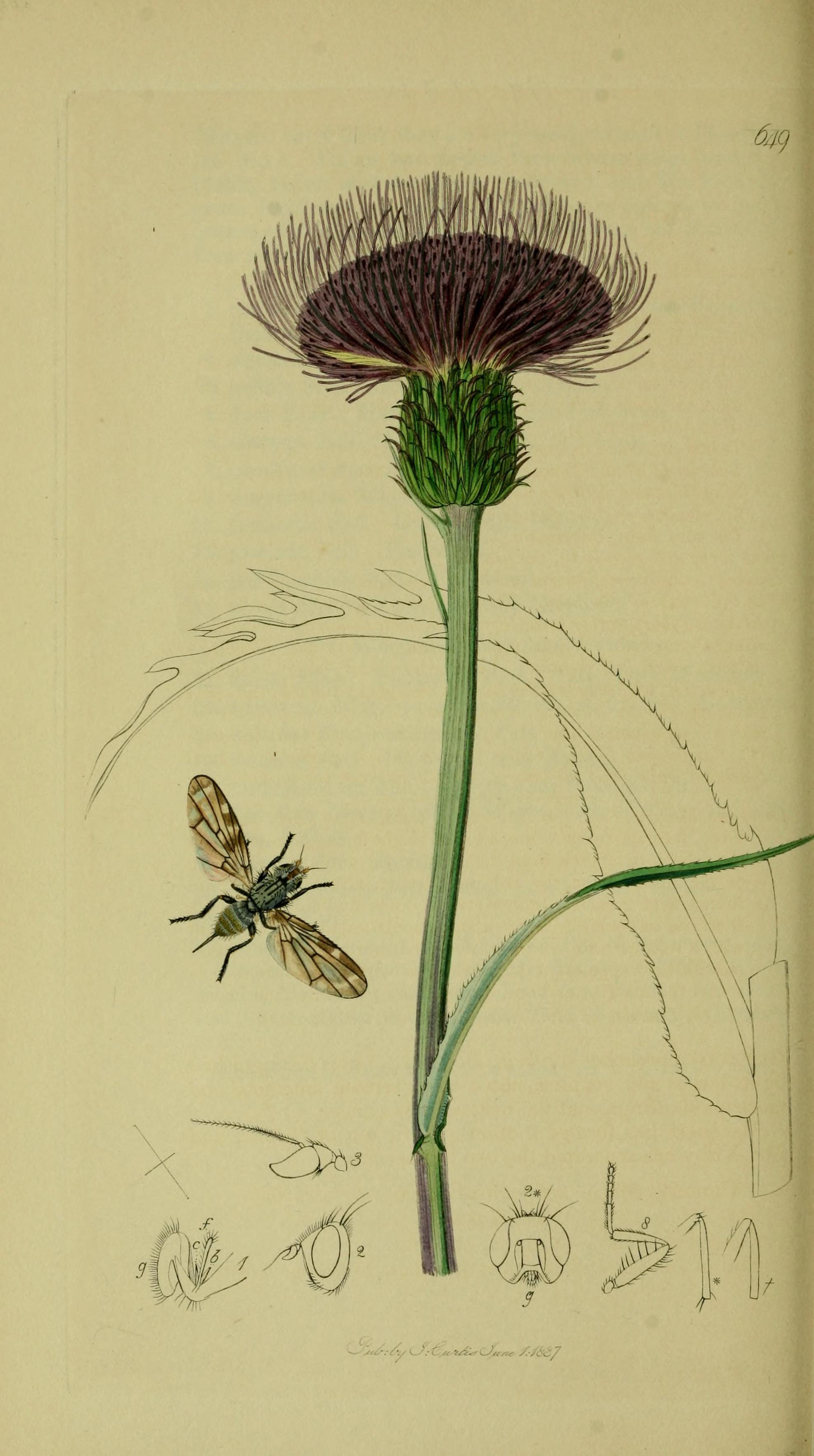
Otites guttata and the thistle Cirsium heterophyllum
