= Proteseia =

Scientific classification
- Kingdom: Animalia
- Phylum: Arthropoda
- Class: Insecta
- Order: Diptera
- Family: Ulidiidae
- Subfamily: Otitinae
- Tribe: Cephaliini
- Genus: Proteseia; Korneyev & Hernandes, 1998

Type species
- Proteseia steyskali Korneyev & Hernandes, 1998

Genus of flies

Proteseia is a genus of picture-winged flies in the family Ulidiidae.

== Species ==
- Proteseia steyskali Korneyev & Hernandes, 1998

== Distribution ==
Mexico.
