= Tujunga mackenziei =

Scientific classification
- Kingdom: Animalia
- Phylum: Arthropoda
- Class: Insecta
- Order: Diptera
- Family: Ulidiidae
- Subfamily: Otitinae
- Genus: Tujunga; Steyskal, 1961
- Species: T. mackenziei

Binomial name
- Tujunga mackenziei Steyskal, 1961

Species of fly

Tujunga is a monotypic genus of picture-winged fly in the family Ulidiidae. Tujunga mackenziei is the sole species in the genus.
