= Herina rivosecchii =

Scientific classification
- Kingdom: Animalia
- Phylum: Arthropoda
- Class: Insecta
- Order: Diptera
- Family: Ulidiidae
- Genus: Herina
- Species: H. rivosecchii

Binomial name
- Herina rivosecchii Merz, 2002

Species of fly

Herina rivosecchii is a species of picture-winged fly in the genus Herina of the family Ulidiidae found in Croatia, France, Greece, Italy, Switzerland, and Spain.
