= Otites cinerosa =

Scientific classification
- Kingdom: Animalia
- Phylum: Arthropoda
- Class: Insecta
- Order: Diptera
- Family: Ulidiidae
- Genus: Otites
- Species: O. cinerosa

Binomial name
- Otites cinerosa Jacentkovsky, 1934

Species of fly

Otites cinerosa is a species of ulidiid or picture-winged fly in the genus Otites of the family Tephritidae.
