= Herina scutellaris =

Scientific classification
- Kingdom: Animalia
- Phylum: Arthropoda
- Class: Insecta
- Order: Diptera
- Family: Ulidiidae
- Genus: Herina
- Species: H. scutellaris

Binomial name
- Herina scutellaris Robineau-Desvoidy, 1830

Synonyms
- Ortalis rufipes Macquart, 1835; Tephronota rufipes: Séguy, 1934

Species of fly

Herina scutellaris is a species of picture-winged fly in the genus Herina of the family Ulidiidae found in most of Western Europe.
