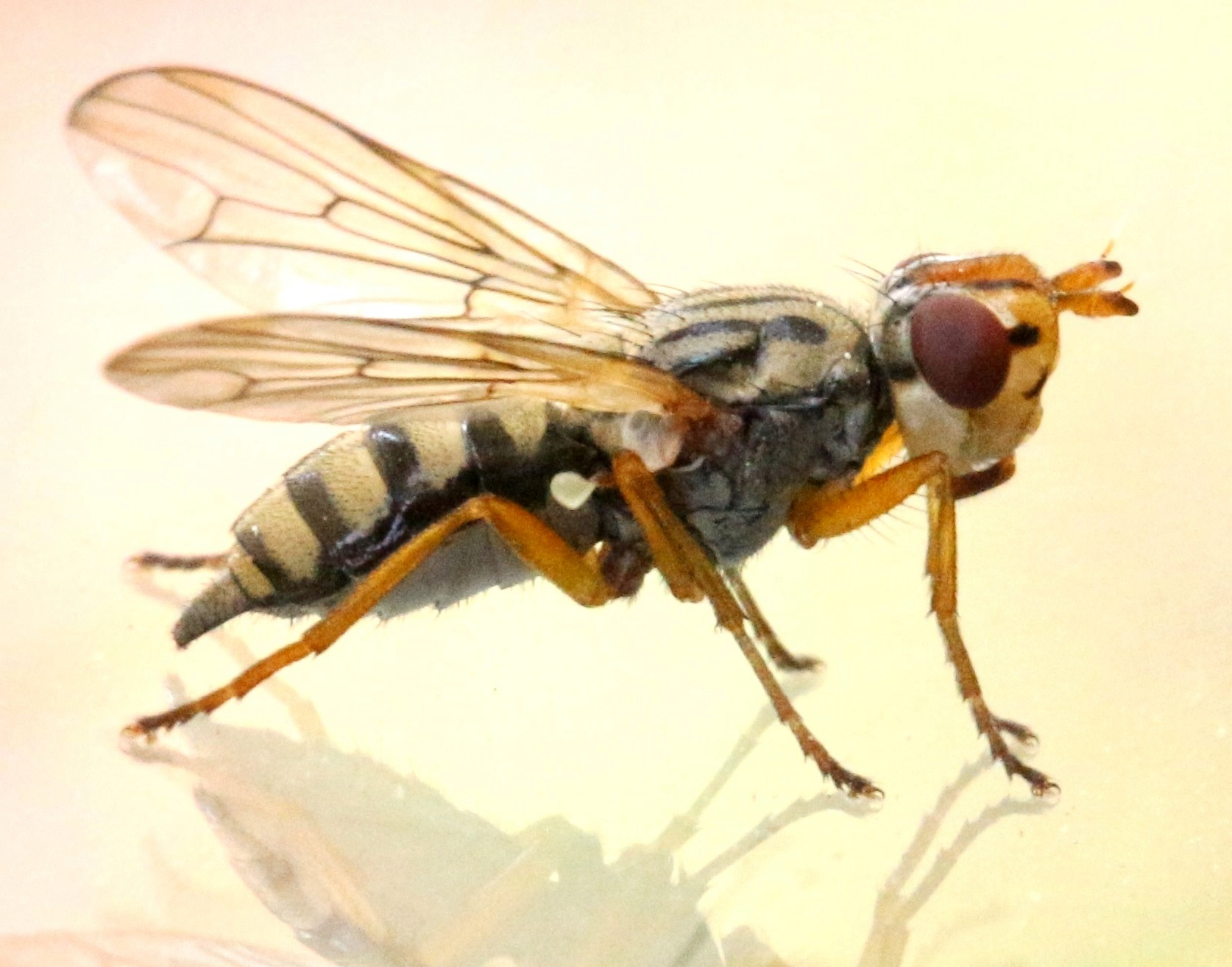

Scientific classification
- Kingdom: Animalia
- Phylum: Arthropoda
- Clade: Pancrustacea
- Class: Insecta
- Order: Diptera
- Family: Ulidiidae
- Genus: Dorycera
- Species: D. judea

Binomial name
- Dorycera judea Hendel, 1908

Synonyms
- Dorycera limpidipennis Becker, 1910; Dorycera subasiatica Becker, 1910

= Dorycera judea =

Species of fly

Dorycera judea is a species of ulidiid or picture-winged fly in the genus Dorycera of the family Ulidiidae. The species is native to Turkey, Syria and Israel.

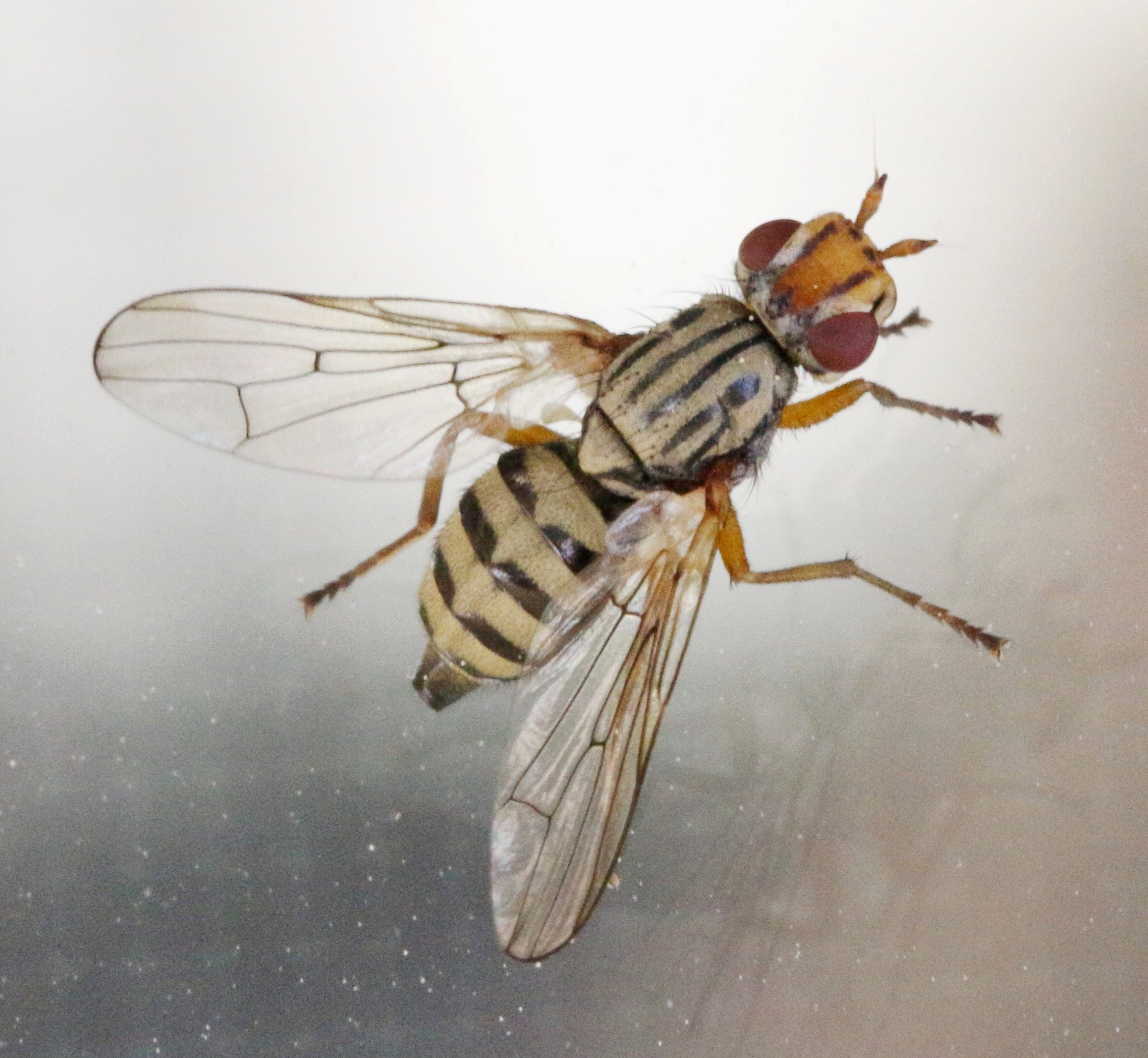
dorsal view
