= Pseudomelieria =

Scientific classification
- Kingdom: Animalia
- Phylum: Arthropoda
- Class: Insecta
- Order: Diptera
- Family: Ulidiidae
- Subfamily: Otitinae
- Genus: Pseudomelieria; Brèthes, 1921

Genus of flies

Pseudomelieria is a genus of picture-winged flies in the family Ulidiidae.

== Species ==
- P. argentina
