= Herina liturata =

Scientific classification
- Kingdom: Animalia
- Phylum: Arthropoda
- Class: Insecta
- Order: Diptera
- Family: Ulidiidae
- Genus: Herina
- Species: H. liturata

Binomial name
- Herina liturata Robineau-Desvoidy, 1830

Species of fly

Herina liturata is a species of picture-winged fly in the genus Herina of the family Ulidiidae found in most of Western Europe.
