= Myiomyrmica =

Scientific classification
- Kingdom: Animalia
- Phylum: Arthropoda
- Class: Insecta
- Order: Diptera
- Family: Ulidiidae
- Subfamily: Otitinae
- Tribe: Cephaliini
- Genus: Myiomyrmica; Steyskal, 1961

Type species
- Cephalia fenestrata Coquillett, 1900

Genus of flies

Myiomyrmica is a genus of picture-winged flies in the family Ulidiidae.

== Species ==
- Myiomyrmica fenestrata (Coquillett, 1900)
