= Otites bivittata =

Scientific classification
- Kingdom: Animalia
- Phylum: Arthropoda
- Class: Insecta
- Order: Diptera
- Family: Ulidiidae
- Genus: Otites
- Species: O. bivittata

Binomial name
- Otites bivittata Macquart, 1835

Species of fly

Otites bivittata is a species of ulidiid or picture-winged fly in the genus Otites of the family Tephritidae.
