= Herina pseudoluctuosa =

Scientific classification
- Kingdom: Animalia
- Phylum: Arthropoda
- Clade: Pancrustacea
- Class: Insecta
- Order: Diptera
- Family: Ulidiidae
- Genus: Herina
- Species: H. pseudoluctuosa

Binomial name
- Herina pseudoluctuosa Hennig, 1939

Species of fly

Herina pseudoluctuosa is a species of picture-winged fly in the genus Herina of the family Ulidiidae found in Hungary, Italy, and Switzerland.
