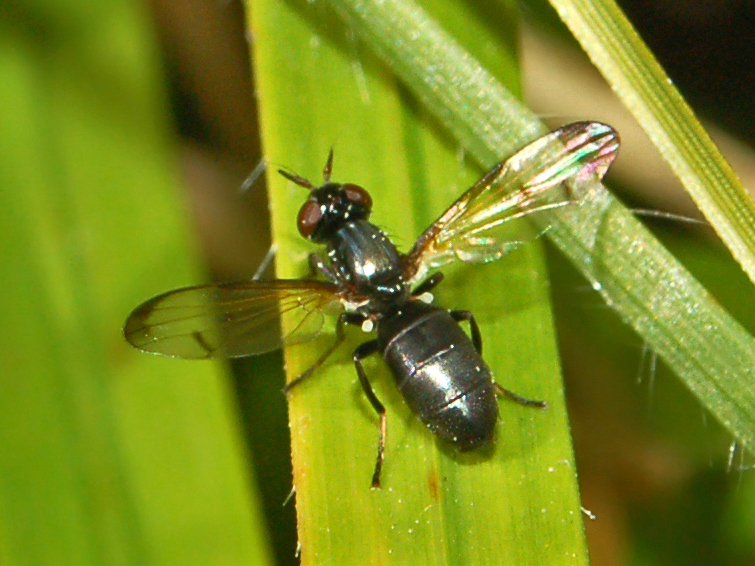
- Herina cf. paludum

Scientific classification
- Kingdom: Animalia
- Phylum: Arthropoda
- Class: Insecta
- Order: Diptera
- Family: Ulidiidae
- Genus: Herina
- Species: H. paludum

Binomial name
- Herina paludum (Fallén, 1820)

Synonyms
- Ortalis paludum Fallén, 1820; Herina longicornis Robineau-Desvoidy, 1830; Herina longicornis Robineau-Desvoidy, 1830

= Herina paludum =

Species of fly

Herina paludum is a species of picture-winged fly in the genus Herina of the family Ulidiidae.

== Distribution ==
This species is present in most of Europe (England, France, Germany, Italy, Latvia, Sweden, Egypt, Austria, Hungary, Romania, Poland, Switzerland, Czech Republic, Slovakia, Germany, Greece and Slovenia) and in North Africa.

== Description ==
Herina paludum can reach a body length of 3–4 millimetres (0.12–0.16 in). In these picture-winged flies mesonotum and abdominal tergites are shining black. Scutellum is brownish-black. The central area of the head between the eyes (frontal stripe) is velvet-black. Face is conspicuously produced anteriorly, lower face is shining black. Eyes are reddish brown. The third segment of the antennae is long and strap-like. Wings are hyaline, with few brown patches, mainly a partly brown costal cell and a rounded or band-like apical spot. Femora and tibiae are partly dark brown.
