= Herina palustris =

Scientific classification
- Kingdom: Animalia
- Phylum: Arthropoda
- Class: Insecta
- Order: Diptera
- Family: Ulidiidae
- Genus: Herina
- Species: H. palustris

Binomial name
- Herina palustris (Meigen, 1826)

Synonyms
- Ortalis palustris Meigen, 1826

Species of fly

Herina palustris is a species of picture-winged fly in the genus Herina of the family Ulidiidae.
