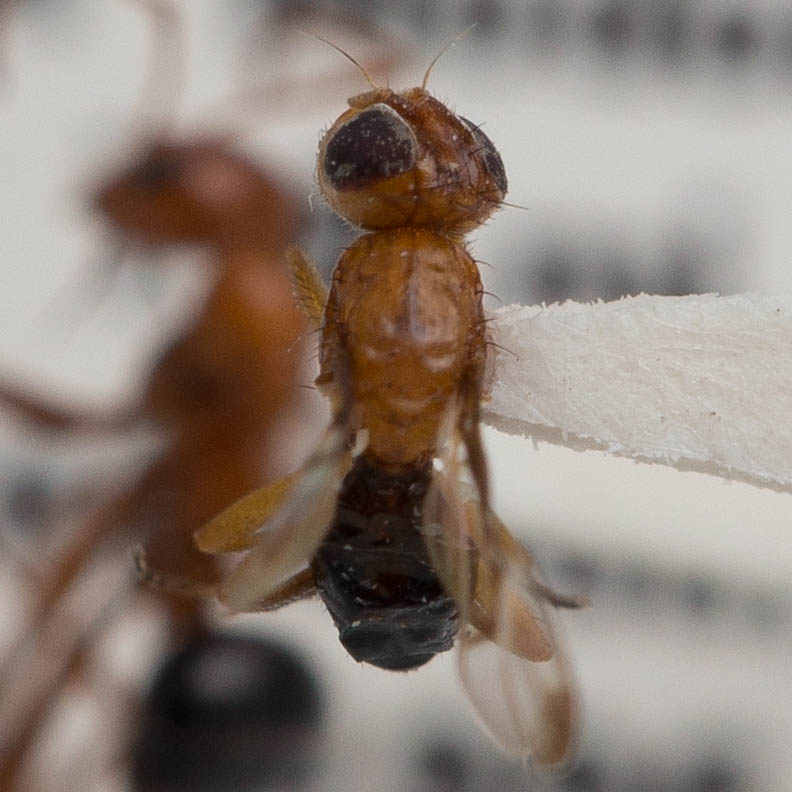
- Haigia nevadana

Scientific classification
- Domain: Eukaryota
- Kingdom: Animalia
- Phylum: Arthropoda
- Class: Insecta
- Order: Diptera
- Family: Ulidiidae
- Tribe: Otitini
- Genus: Haigia; Steyskal, 1961

= Haigia =

Genus of flies

Haigia is a genus of picture-winged flies in the family Ulidiidae.

== Species ==
- H. nevadana
