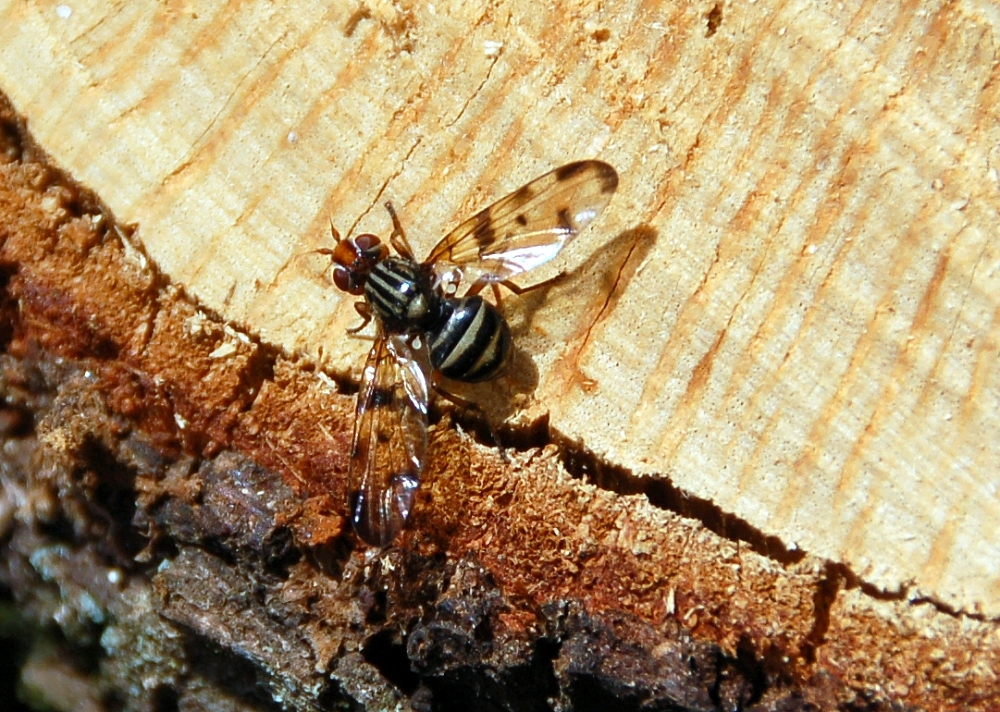
- Otites formosa

Scientific classification
- Kingdom: Animalia
- Phylum: Arthropoda
- Clade: Pancrustacea
- Class: Insecta
- Order: Diptera
- Family: Ulidiidae
- Subfamily: Otitinae
- Tribe: Otitini
- Genus: Otites; Latreille, 1804

Synonyms
- Meckelia Robineau-Desvoidy, 1830; Pteropoecila Loew, 1868; Ptilonota Loew, 1868; Heramya Robineau-Desvoidy, 1830

= Otites =

Genus of flies

Otites is a genus of picture-winged fly in the family Ulidiidae.

== Species ==
- Otites angustata (Loew, 1859)
- Otites anthomyina Hendel, 1911
- Otites approximata Hendel, 1911
- Otites atripes Loew, 1858
- Otites bacescui Gheorghiu, 1987
- Otites bimaculata Hendel, 1911
- Otites bivittata Macquart, 1835
- Otites bradescui Gheorghiu, 1988
- Otites centralis (Fabricius, 1805)
- Otites cinerosa Jacentkovsky, 1934
- Otites dominula (Loew, 1868)
- Otites erythrocephala (Hendel, 1911)
- Otites erythrosceles Steyskal, 1966
- Otites formosa (Panzer, 1798)
- Otites gradualis Carles-Tolra, 1998
- Otites grata (Loew, 1856)
- Otites guttatus (Meigen, 1830)
- Otites immaculata (Rondani, 1869)
- Otites jucunda (Robineau-Desvoidy, 1830)
- Otites kowarzi (Loew, 1873)
- Otites lamed (Schrank, 1781)
- Otites levigata (Loew, 1873)
- Otites maculipennis (Latreille, 1811)
- Otites michiganus Steyskal, 1966
- Otites mucescens Hendel, 1911
- Otites murina (Loew, 1864)
- Otites nebulosa (Latreille, 1811)
- Otites obliqua (Loew, 1868)
- Heramya populicola Robineau-Desvoidy, 1830
- Otites pyrrhocephala (Loew, 1876)
- Otites rivularis (Fabricius, 1805)
- Otites silvicola (Rivosecchi, 1992)
- Otites snowi (Cresson, 1924)
- Otites stigma (Hendel, 1911)
