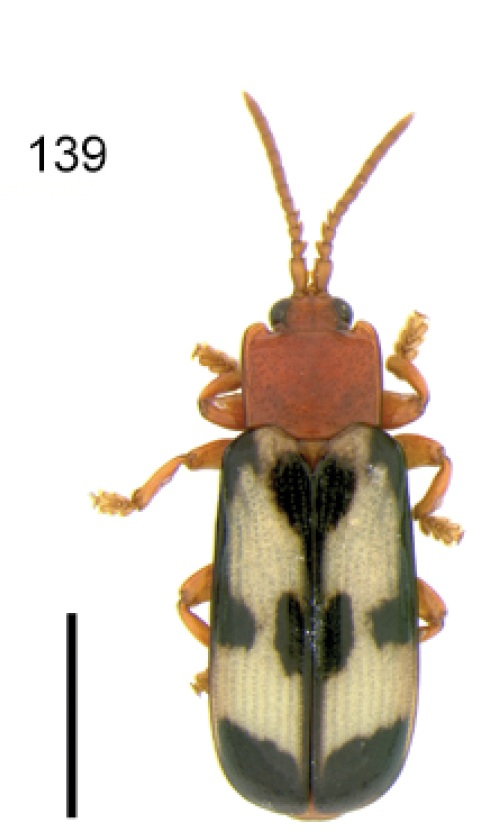

Scientific classification
- Kingdom: Animalia
- Phylum: Arthropoda
- Class: Insecta
- Order: Coleoptera
- Suborder: Polyphaga
- Infraorder: Cucujiformia
- Family: Chrysomelidae
- Genus: Cephaloleia
- Species: C. fenestrata

Binomial name
- Cephaloleia fenestrata Weise, 1910

Synonyms
- Cephalolia quadrimaculata Uhmann, 1930

= Cephaloleia fenestrata =

Species of beetle

Cephaloleia fenestrata is a species of beetle in the family Chrysomelidae. It is found in Costa Rica and Panama.

== Description ==
Adults reach a length of about 6.4–8 mm. The head, pronotum, scutellum, legs and antennomeres 1–2 are red, while antennomeres 3–11 are red or black. The elytron has a black sutural vitta and a lateral vitta which narrows from base to the apex, as well as six reddish maculae.

== Biology ==
Adults have been collected on Ischnosiphon species (including Ischnosiphon cerotus) and Pleiostachya pruinosa.
