= Acrostictella =

Scientific classification
- Kingdom: Animalia
- Phylum: Arthropoda
- Clade: Pancrustacea
- Class: Insecta
- Order: Diptera
- Family: Ulidiidae
- Tribe: Cephaliini
- Genus: Acrostictella; Hendel, 1914
- Species: A. parallela

Binomial name
- Acrostictella parallela Hendel, 1914

Genus of flies

Acrostictella is a genus of picture-winged flies in the family Ulidiidae, containing a single species, Acrostictella parallela.

== Distribution ==
Brazil, Paraguay, Argentina.
