= Ulidiopsis =

Scientific classification
- Kingdom: Animalia
- Phylum: Arthropoda
- Clade: Pancrustacea
- Class: Insecta
- Order: Diptera
- Family: Ulidiidae
- Genus: Ulidiopsis; Hennig, 1939
- Species: U. mirabilis

Binomial name
- Ulidiopsis mirabilis Hennig, 1939

Genus of flies

Ulidiopsis is a genus of picture-winged flies in the family Ulidiidae. There is at least one described species in Ulidiopsis, U. mirabilis.
