= Otites formosa =

Scientific classification
- Kingdom: Animalia
- Phylum: Arthropoda
- Clade: Pancrustacea
- Class: Insecta
- Order: Diptera
- Family: Ulidiidae
- Genus: Otites
- Species: O. formosa

Binomial name
- Otites formosa (Panzer, 1798)

Synonyms
- Ortalis formosa; Musca formosa Scopoli, 1763; Scatophaga ruficeps Fabricius, 1805; Dictya gangraenosa Fabricius, 1805; Otites elegans Latreille, 1805; Ortalis ornata Meigen, 1826; Ortalis genualis Loew, 1868

Species of fly

Otites formosa is a species of ulidiid or picture-winged fly in the genus Otites of the family Ulidiidae.

== Description ==
Otites formosa can reach a body length of 5–10 millimetres (0.20–0.39 in). The head is orange-red and the large compound eyes are reddish. Mesonotum shows four longitudinal black stripes, while the abdomen has three large transversal black stripes. The wings are decorated with distinctive dark drawings. Adults feed on flowers, specially Apiaceae, while the larvae feed on plants, litter or faeces.

== Distribution ==
This species is present in Albania, Belgium, Bulgaria, Croatia, Czech Republic, France, Germany, Greece, Hungary, Italy, Poland, Romania, Russia, eastern Palearctic realm, and in the Near East.
