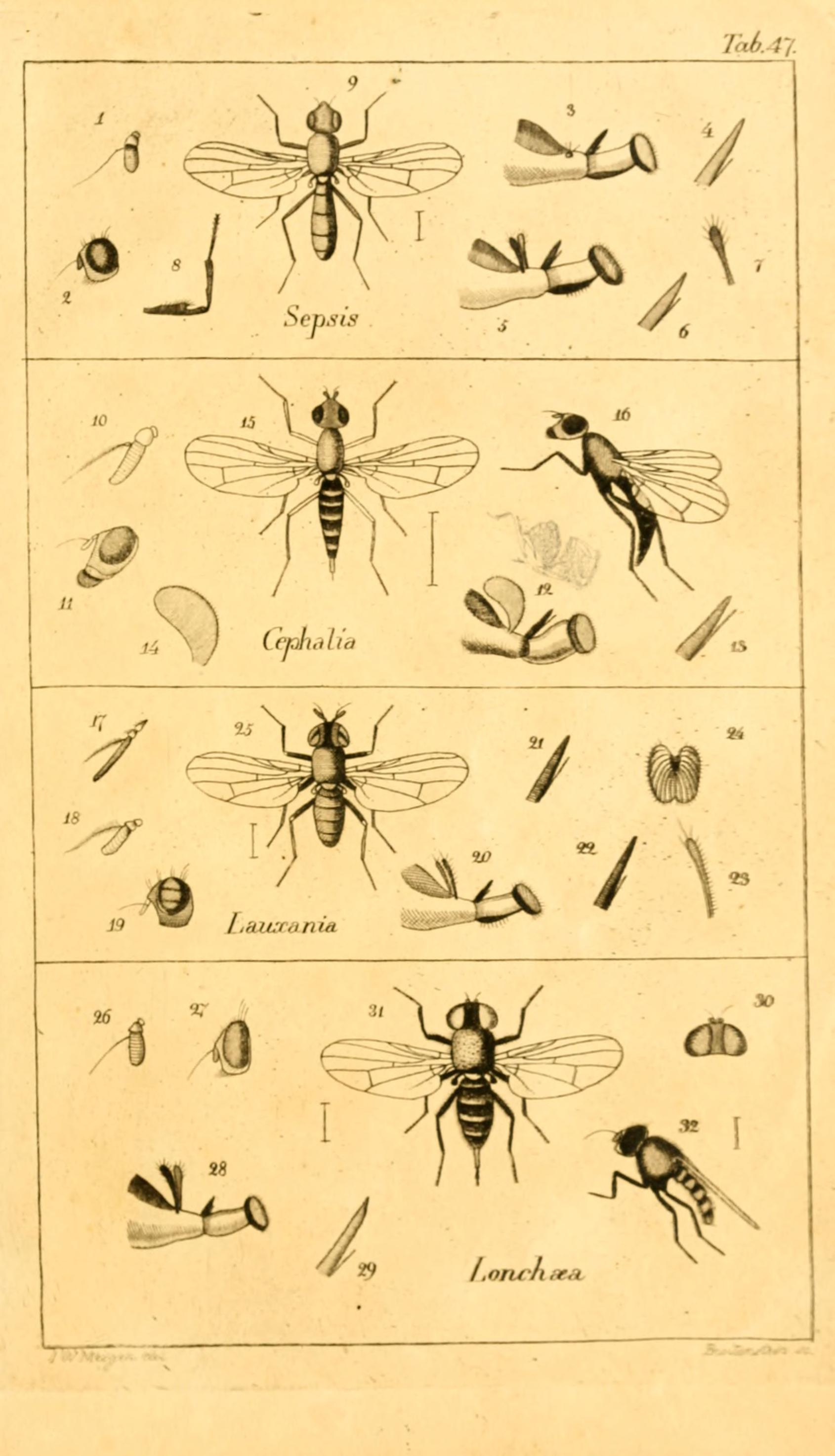
- Cepahalia in Meigen Systematische Beschreibung der bekannten europäischen zweiflügeligen Insekten 1826

Scientific classification
- Kingdom: Animalia
- Phylum: Arthropoda
- Clade: Pancrustacea
- Class: Insecta
- Order: Diptera
- Family: Ulidiidae
- Subfamily: Otitinae
- Tribe: Cephaliini
- Genus: Cephalia; Meigen, 1826

Type species
- Cephalia nigripes Meigen, 1826

Synonyms
- Myrmecomya Robineau-Desvoidy, 1830; Myrmecomyia Agassiz, 1846; Myrmecomyia Loew, 1873

= Cephalia =

Genus of flies

Cephalia is a genus of picture-winged flies in the family Ulidiidae, containing a single species.

== Species ==
- Cephalia rufipes Meigen, 1826

Several other species have been included in this genus in the past.
