= Pietro Rossi (scientist) =

Italian scientist and entomologist

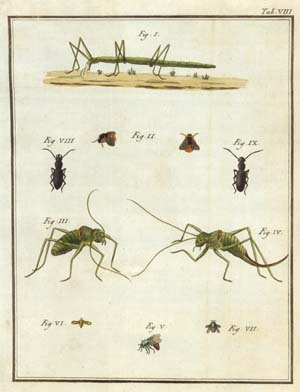
Plate from Fauna etrusca of 1790

Pietro Rossi (23 January 1738 in Florence – 21 December 1804 in Pisa) was an Italian scientist and entomologist.

== Career ==
Rossi's academic career was conducted at the University of Pisa, where he attained a doctorate in philosophy and medicine in 1759. He was then made a professor of logic in 1763, a position he held until 1801, when he finally received the chair for natural history with the special field "insectology", making him the world's first professor of entomology. His publications, particularly Fauna etrusca (1790) and Mantissa insectorum (1792), are considered pioneering achievements of entomology and still possess scientific validity in the fields of taxonomy and biological nomenclature. Parts of his collection were once in the possession of Johann Christian Ludwig Hellwig in Braunschweig; these are now in the Natural History Museum of Berlin. In 1793, he was elected a foreign member of the Royal Swedish Academy of Sciences. After his death, the Museo entomologico Pietro Rossi was integrated into the Museo Civico di Storia Naturale di Milano in Milan.
