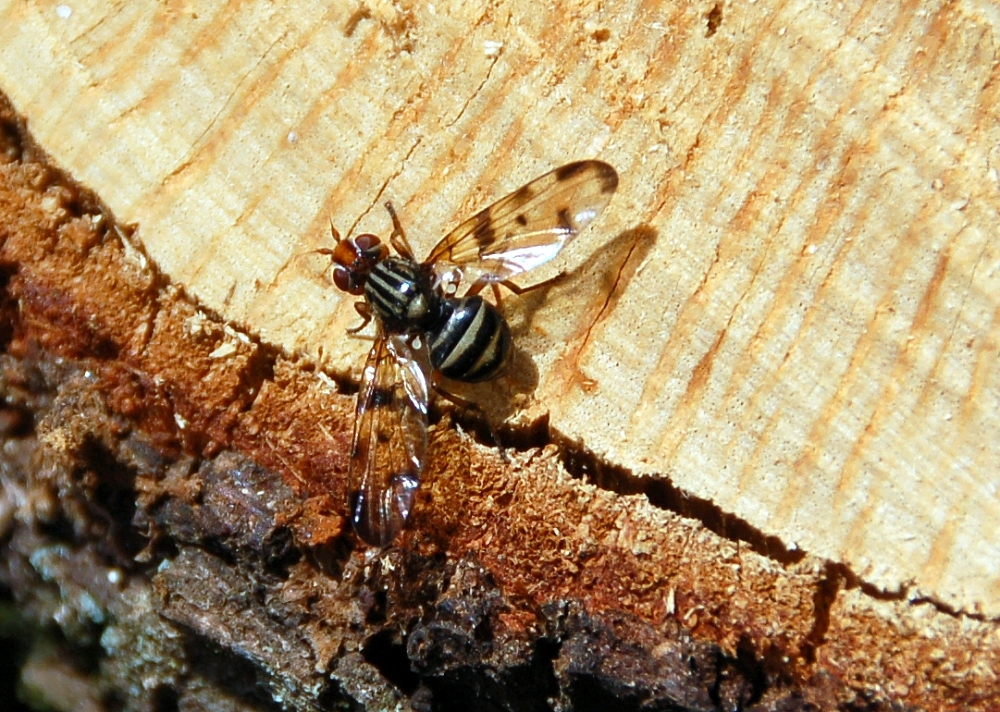
- Otites formosa

Scientific classification
- Kingdom: Animalia
- Phylum: Arthropoda
- Class: Insecta
- Order: Diptera
- Subsection: Acalyptratae
- Superfamily: Tephritoidea
- Family: Ulidiidae
- Subfamily: Otitinae; Aldrich, 1932

= Otitinae =

Subfamily of flies

Otitinae is the name of a subfamily of flies in the family Ulidiidae. It was formerly the Otitidae. Like the Ulidiinae, most species are herbivorous or saprophagous. Most species share with the Tephritidae an unusual elongated projection of the anal cell in the wing, but can be differentiated by the smoothly curving subcostal vein. Most are dull gray to shiny brown or black flies with vein R_{1} setulose or, in a few cases, bare.

== Tribes and genera ==
- Tribe Cephaliini

- Acrostictella Hendel, 1914
- Cephalia Meigen, 1826
- Delphinia Robineau-Desvoidy, 1830
- Myiomyrmica Steyskal, 1961
- Myrmecothea Hendel, 1910
- Proteseia Korneyev & Hernandes, 1998
- Pterotaenia Rondani, 1868
- Tritoxa Loew, 1873

- Tribe Myennidini

- Acatochaeta Enderlein, 1921
- Arborotites Barraclough, 2000
- Callopistromyia Hendel, 1907
- Dyscrasis Aldrich, 1932
- Myennis Robineau-Desvoidy, 1830
- Namibotites Barraclough, 2000
- Neodyscrasis Kameneva & Korneyev, 2006
- Oedopa Loew, 1868
- Paroedopa Coquillett, 1900
- Pseudodyscrasis Hernández-Ortiz, 1988
- Pseudotephritina Malloch, 1931
- Pseudotephritis Johnson, 1902
- Stictoedopa Brèthes, 1926
- Stictomyia Bigot, 1885
- Ulidiotites Steyskal, 1961

- Tribe Otitini

- Ceroxys Macquart, 1835
- Dorycera Meigen, 1830
- Herina Robineau-Desvoidy, 1830
- Hiatus Cresson, 1906
- Melieria Robineau-Desvoidy, 1830
- Otites Latreille, 1804
- Tetanops Fallén, 1820
- Ulidiopsis Hennig, 1941

- Otitinae incertae sedis

- Curranops Harriot, 1942
- Diacrita Gerstäcker, 1860
- Haigia Steyskal, 1961
- Idana Loew, 1873
- Psaeropterella Hendel, 1914
- Pseudomelieria Brèthes, 1921
- Tetropismenus Loew, 1876
- Tujunga Steyskal, 1961
