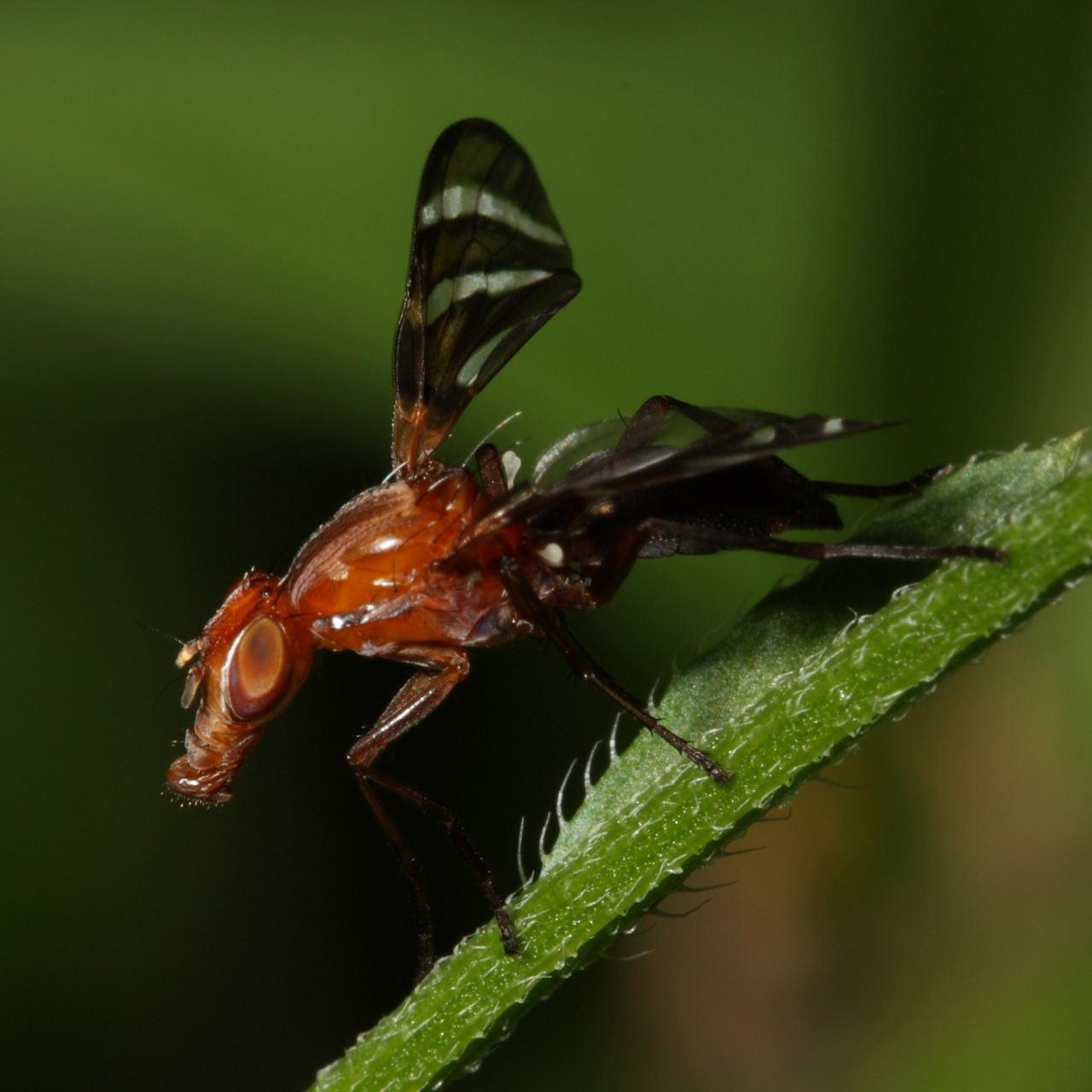
- Tritoxa incurva

Scientific classification
- Kingdom: Animalia
- Phylum: Arthropoda
- Class: Insecta
- Order: Diptera
- Family: Ulidiidae
- Subfamily: Otitinae
- Tribe: Cephaliini; Schiner, 1864

= Cephaliini =

Tribe of flies

Cephaliini is a tribe of picture-winged flies in the family Ulidiidae.

== Genera ==
- Acrostictella Hendel, 1914
- Cephalia Meigen, 1826
- Delphinia Robineau-Desvoidy, 1830
- Myiomyrmica Steyskal, 1961
- Myrmecothea Hendel, 1910
- Proteseia Korneyev & Hernandes, 1998
- Pterotaenia Rondani, 1868
- Tritoxa Loew, 1873
