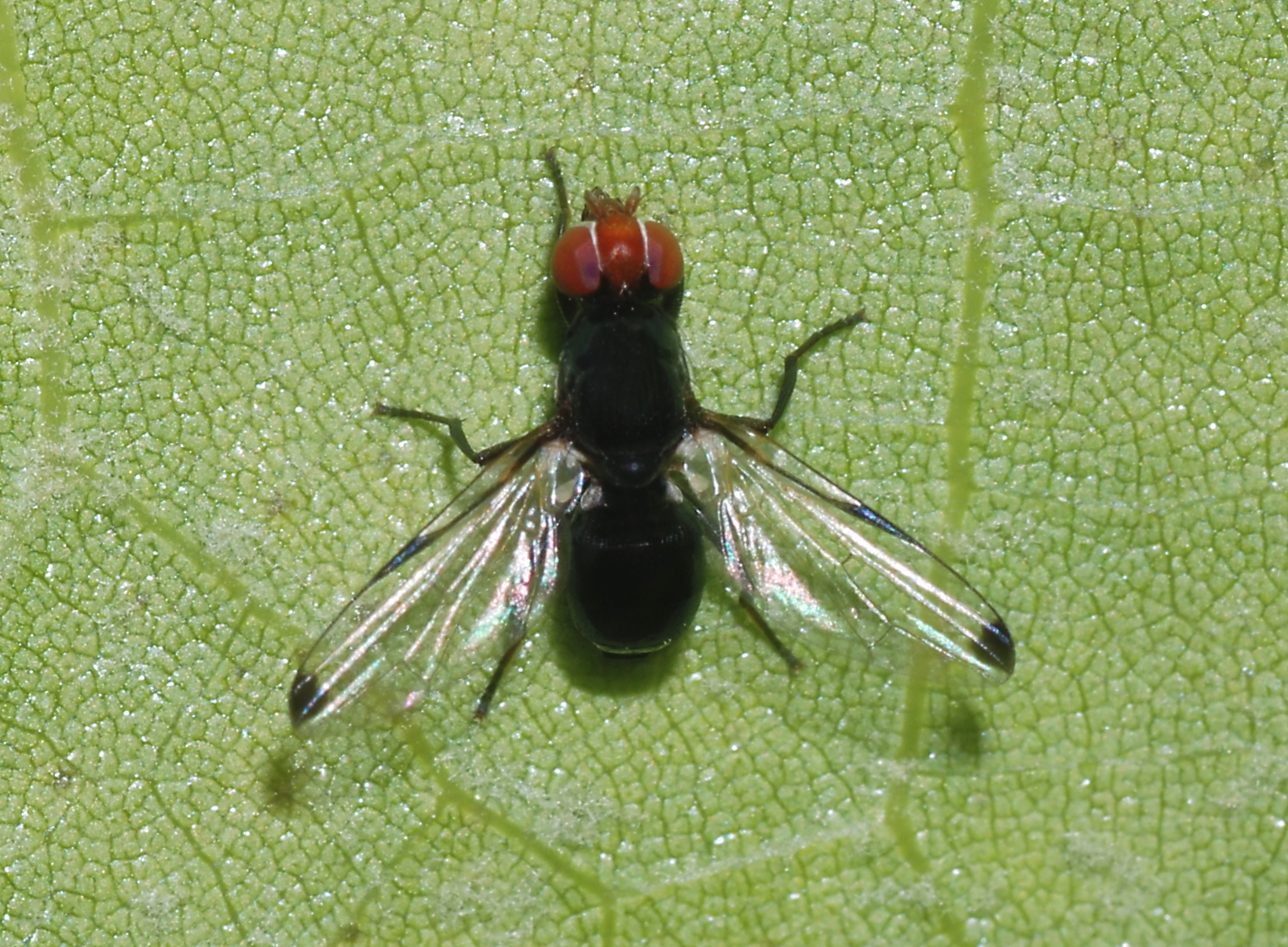
- Seioptera vibrans

Scientific classification
- Kingdom: Animalia
- Phylum: Arthropoda
- Clade: Pancrustacea
- Class: Insecta
- Order: Diptera
- Family: Ulidiidae
- Subfamily: Ulidiinae; Macquart, 1835

= Ulidiinae =

Subfamily of flies

The Ulidiinae are a subfamily of flies in the family Ulidiidae. Like the Otitinae, most species are herbivorous or saprophagous. Most species share with the Tephritidae an unusual elongated projection of the anal cell in the wing but can be differentiated by the smoothly curving subcostal vein. Most are dull gray to shiny brown or black flies with vein R_{1} setulose or, in a few cases, bare.

== Tribes and genera ==
- Tribe Lipsanini

- Acrosticta Loew, 1868
- Acrostictomyia Blanchard, 1938
- Aspistomella Hendel, 1909

Syn.: Paraphyola Hendel, 1909

- Axiologina Hendel, 1909
- Cenchrometopa Hendel, 1909
- Chaetopsis Loew, 1868
- Euacaina Steyskal, 1963
- Eumecosomyia Hendel, 1909
- Eumetopiella Hendel, 1907
- Euphara Loew, 1868
- Euxesta Loew, 1868
- Heterodoxa J. R. Malloch, 1832
- Hypoecta Loew, 1868
- Lipsana Enderlein, 1938
- Neoeuxesta J. R. Malloch, 1930
- Notogramma Loew, 1868
- Pareuxesta Coquillett, 1901
- Perissoneura J. R. Malloch, 1832
- Polyteloptera Hendel, 1909
- Pseudeuxesta Hendel, 1910
- Siopa Hendel, 1909
- Steneretma Loew, 1868
- Stenomyia Loew, 1868
- Texasa Steyskal, 1961
- Ulivellia Speiser, 1929
- Vladolinia Kameneva, 2005
- Zacompsia Coquillett, 1901

- Tribe Pterocallini

- Aciuroides Hendel, 1914
- Apterocerina Hendel, 1909
- Chondrometopum Hendel, 1909
- Coscinum Hendel, 1909
- Cymatozus Enderlein, 1912
- Cyrtomostoma Hendel, 1909
- Dasymetopa Loew, 1868
- Elapata Hendel, 1909
- Goniaeola Hendel, 1909
- Lathrostigma Enderlein
- Megalaemyia Hendel, 1909
- Micropterocerus Hendel, 1914
- Neomyennis Hendel, 1914
- Ophthalmoptera Hendel, 1909
- Paragoniaeola?
- Paragorgopis Giglio-Tos, 1893
- Parophthalmoptera?
- Perissoza?
- Plagiocephalus Wiedemann, 1830
- Pterocalla Rondani, 1848
- Pterocerina Hendel, 1909
- Sympaectria Hendel, 1909
- Rhyparella Hendel, 1909
- Terpnomyennis Kameneva, 2004
- Terpnomyia Hendel, 1909
- Tetrapleura Schiner, 1868
- Xanthacrona Wulp, 1899

- Tribe Seiopterini

- Homalocephala Zetterstedt, 1838

Syn.: Psairoptera

- Pseudoseioptera Stackelberg 1955
- Seioptera Kirby, 1817

Syn.: Ortalis Fallén, 1810

- Tribe Ulidiini

- Physiphora Fallén, 1810
- Timia Wiedemann, 1824
- Ulidia Meigen, 1826
