= Zacompsia metallica =

Scientific classification
- Kingdom: Animalia
- Phylum: Arthropoda
- Class: Insecta
- Order: Diptera
- Family: Ulidiidae
- Genus: Zacompsia
- Species: Z. metallica

Binomial name
- Zacompsia metallica Curran, 1934

Species of fly

Zacompsia metallica is a species of ulidiid or picture-winged fly in the genus Zacompsia of the family Ulidiidae.
