= Cymatozus polymorphomyiodes =

Scientific classification
- Kingdom: Animalia
- Phylum: Arthropoda
- Clade: Pancrustacea
- Class: Insecta
- Order: Diptera
- Family: Ulidiidae
- Genus: Cymatozus
- Species: C. polymorphomyiodes

Binomial name
- Cymatozus polymorphomyiodes Enderlein, 1912

Species of fly

Cymatozus polymorphomyiodes is a species of ulidiid or picture-winged fly in the genus Cymatozus of the family Ulidiidae.
