= Neomyennis appendiculata =

Scientific classification
- Kingdom: Animalia
- Phylum: Arthropoda
- Class: Insecta
- Order: Diptera
- Family: Ulidiidae
- Genus: Neomyennis
- Species: N. appendiculata

Binomial name
- Neomyennis appendiculata (Hendel, 1909)

Synonyms
- Myennis appendiculata Hendel, 1909

Species of fly

Neomyennis appendiculata is a species of ulidiid or picture-winged fly in the genus Neomyennis of the family Ulidiidae.

== Distribution ==
Brazil, Paraguay, Uruguay, Argentina.
