= Cymatozus fenestellatus =

Scientific classification
- Kingdom: Animalia
- Phylum: Arthropoda
- Clade: Pancrustacea
- Class: Insecta
- Order: Diptera
- Family: Ulidiidae
- Genus: Cymatozus
- Species: C. fenestellatus

Binomial name
- Cymatozus fenestellatus (Hendel, 1909)

Synonyms
- Megalaemyia fenestellatus Hendel, 1909

Species of fly

Cymatozus fenestellatus is a species of ulidiid or picture-winged fly in the genus Cymatozus of the family Ulidiidae.
