= Heterodoxa uapouae =

Scientific classification
- Kingdom: Animalia
- Phylum: Arthropoda
- Class: Insecta
- Order: Diptera
- Family: Ulidiidae
- Genus: Heterodoxa
- Species: H. uapouae

Binomial name
- Heterodoxa uapouae Malloch, 1932

Species of fly

Heterodoxa uapouae is a species of ulidiid or picture-winged fly in the genus Heterodoxa of the family Ulidiidae.
