= Homalocephala mamaevi =

Scientific classification
- Kingdom: Animalia
- Phylum: Arthropoda
- Class: Insecta
- Order: Diptera
- Family: Ulidiidae
- Genus: Homalocephala
- Species: H. mamaevi

Binomial name
- Homalocephala mamaevi Krivosheina & Krivosheina, 1995

Species of fly

Homalocephala mamaevi is a species of ulidiid or picture-winged fly in the genus Homalocephala of the family Tephritidae.
