= Idanophana gephyra =

Scientific classification
- Kingdom: Animalia
- Phylum: Arthropoda
- Class: Insecta
- Order: Diptera
- Family: Ulidiidae
- Genus: Idanophana
- Species: I. gephyra

Binomial name
- Idanophana gephyra Hering, 1938

Species of fly

Idanophana gephyra is a species of fly in the genus Idanophana of the family Ulidiidae.
