= Homalocephala similis =

Scientific classification
- Kingdom: Animalia
- Phylum: Arthropoda
- Clade: Pancrustacea
- Class: Insecta
- Order: Diptera
- Family: Ulidiidae
- Genus: Homalocephala
- Species: H. similis

Binomial name
- Homalocephala similis (Cresson, 1924)

Synonyms
- Psairoptera similis Cresson, 1924

Species of fly

Homalocephala similis is a species of ulidiid or picture-winged fly in the genus Homalocephala of the family Ulidiidae.
