= Megalaemyia punctulata =

Scientific classification
- Kingdom: Animalia
- Phylum: Arthropoda
- Class: Insecta
- Order: Diptera
- Family: Ulidiidae
- Genus: Megalaemyia
- Species: M. punctulata

Binomial name
- Megalaemyia punctulata Hendel, 1909

Species of fly

Megalaemyia punctulata is a species of ulidiid or picture-winged fly in the genus Megalaemyia of the family Ulidiidae.
