= Xanthacrona tripustulata =

Scientific classification
- Kingdom: Animalia
- Phylum: Arthropoda
- Clade: Pancrustacea
- Class: Insecta
- Order: Diptera
- Family: Ulidiidae
- Genus: Xanthacrona
- Species: X. tripustulata

Binomial name
- Xanthacrona tripustulata Enderlein, 1921

Species of fly

Xanthacrona tripustulata is a species of ulidiid or picture-winged fly in the genus Xanthacrona of the family Tephritidae.
