= Neoeuxesta guamana =

Scientific classification
- Domain: Eukaryota
- Kingdom: Animalia
- Phylum: Arthropoda
- Class: Insecta
- Order: Diptera
- Family: Ulidiidae
- Genus: Neoeuxesta
- Species: N. guamana

Binomial name
- Neoeuxesta guamana Steyskal, 1952

Species of fly

Neoeuxesta guamana is a species of ulidiid, or picture-winged fly, in the genus Neoeuxesta. It is found in Guam.
