= Pseudoseioptera ingrica =

Scientific classification
- Kingdom: Animalia
- Phylum: Arthropoda
- Clade: Pancrustacea
- Class: Insecta
- Order: Diptera
- Family: Ulidiidae
- Genus: Pseudoseioptera
- Species: P. ingrica

Binomial name
- Pseudoseioptera ingrica Stackelberg, 1955

Species of fly

Pseudoseioptera ingrica is a species of ulidiid or picture-winged fly in the genus Pseudoseioptera of the family Ulidiidae.
