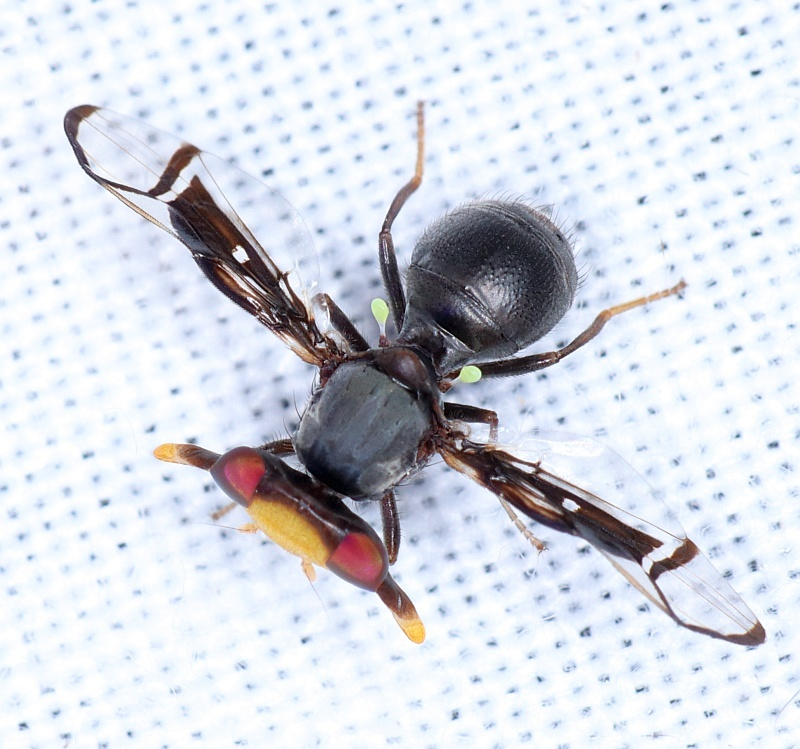

Scientific classification
- Kingdom: Animalia
- Phylum: Arthropoda
- Class: Insecta
- Order: Diptera
- Family: Ulidiidae
- Genus: Chondrometopum
- Species: C. arcuatum

Binomial name
- Chondrometopum arcuatum Hendel, 1909

= Chondrometopum arcuatum =

Species of fly

Chondrometopum arcuatum is a species of ulidiid or picture-winged fly in the family Tephritidae.
