= Terpnomyia tigrina =

Scientific classification
- Kingdom: Animalia
- Phylum: Arthropoda
- Class: Insecta
- Order: Diptera
- Family: Ulidiidae
- Genus: Terpnomyia
- Species: T. tigrina

Binomial name
- Terpnomyia tigrina Blanchard, 1967

Species of fly

Terpnomyia tigrina is a species of ulidiid or picture-winged fly in the genus Terpnomyia of the family Ulidiidae.
