= Terpnomyia citrivitta =

Scientific classification
- Kingdom: Animalia
- Phylum: Arthropoda
- Clade: Pancrustacea
- Class: Insecta
- Order: Diptera
- Family: Ulidiidae
- Genus: Terpnomyia
- Species: T. citrivitta

Binomial name
- Terpnomyia citrivitta Enderlein, 1921

Species of fly

Terpnomyia citrivitta is a species of ulidiid or picture-winged fly in the genus Terpnomyia of the family Ulidiidae.
