= Megalaemyia excellens =

Scientific classification
- Kingdom: Animalia
- Phylum: Arthropoda
- Clade: Pancrustacea
- Class: Insecta
- Order: Diptera
- Family: Ulidiidae
- Genus: Megalaemyia
- Species: M. excellens

Binomial name
- Megalaemyia excellens (Hendel, 1914)

Synonyms
- Megaloprepemyia excellens Hendel, 1914

Species of fly

Megalaemyia excellens is a species of ulidiid or picture-winged fly in the genus Megalaemyia of the family Ulidiidae.
