= Dasymetopa fumipennis =

Scientific classification
- Kingdom: Animalia
- Phylum: Arthropoda
- Clade: Pancrustacea
- Class: Insecta
- Order: Diptera
- Family: Ulidiidae
- Genus: Dasymetopa
- Species: D. fumipennis

Binomial name
- Dasymetopa fumipennis Hendel, 1909

Synonyms
- Dasymetopa fuscicosta Hendel, 1911

Species of fly

Dasymetopa fumipennis is a species of ulidiid or picture-winged fly in the genus Dasymetopa of the family Ulidiidae.
