= Homalocephala apicalis =

Scientific classification
- Kingdom: Animalia
- Phylum: Arthropoda
- Clade: Pancrustacea
- Class: Insecta
- Order: Diptera
- Family: Ulidiidae
- Genus: Homalocephala
- Species: H. apicalis

Binomial name
- Homalocephala apicalis Wahlberg, 1839

Species of fly

Homalocephala apicalis is a species of ulidiid or picture-winged fly in the genus Homalocephala of the family Ulidiidae.
