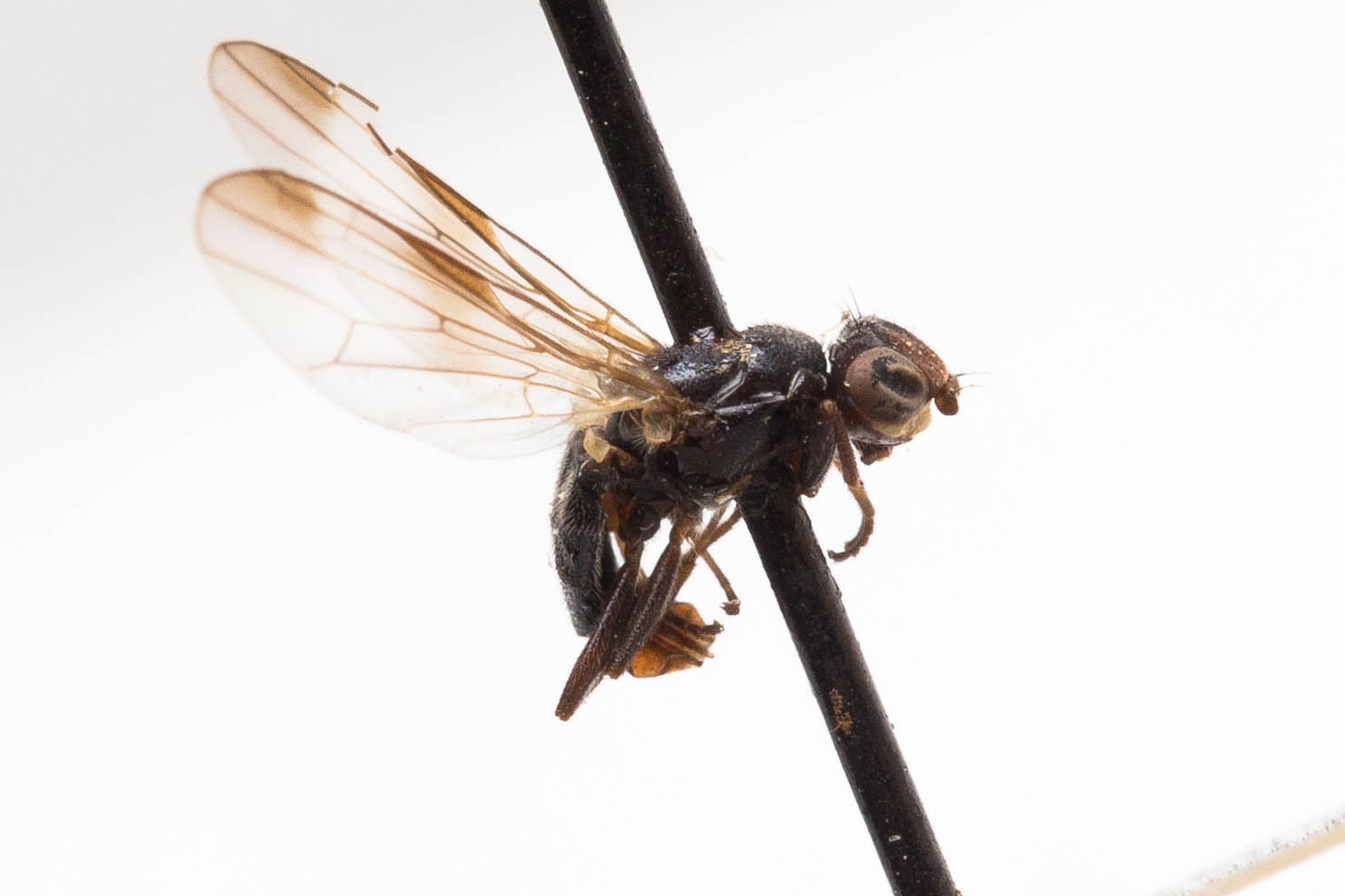

Scientific classification
- Kingdom: Animalia
- Phylum: Arthropoda
- Clade: Pancrustacea
- Class: Insecta
- Order: Diptera
- Family: Ulidiidae
- Genus: Homalocephala
- Species: H. albitarsis

Binomial name
- Homalocephala albitarsis Zetterstedt, 1838

Synonyms
- Euxesta albitarsis Zetterstedt, 1838; Homalocephala biumbrata (Wahlberg, 1838); Psairoptera biumbrata Wahlberg, 1839

= Homalocephala albitarsis =

Species of fly

Homalocephala albitarsis is a species of ulidiid or picture-winged fly in the genus Homalocephala of the family Ulidiidae.
