= Parophthalmoptera picea =

Scientific classification
- Kingdom: Animalia
- Phylum: Arthropoda
- Class: Insecta
- Order: Diptera
- Family: Ulidiidae
- Genus: Parophthalmoptera
- Species: P. picea

Binomial name
- Parophthalmoptera picea Hendel, 1914

Species of fly

Parophthalmoptera picea is a species of ulidiid or picture-winged fly in the genus Parophthalmoptera of the family Ulidiidae.
