= Siopa longicornis =

Scientific classification
- Kingdom: Animalia
- Phylum: Arthropoda
- Class: Insecta
- Order: Diptera
- Family: Ulidiidae
- Genus: Siopa
- Species: S. longicornis

Binomial name
- Siopa longicornis Hendel, 1909

Species of fly

Siopa longicornis is a species of ulidiid or picture-winged fly in the genus Siopa of the family Ulidiidae.
