= Ulivellia inversa =

Scientific classification
- Kingdom: Animalia
- Phylum: Arthropoda
- Class: Insecta
- Order: Diptera
- Family: Ulidiidae
- Genus: Ulivellia
- Species: U. inversa

Binomial name
- Ulivellia inversa Speiser, 1929

Species of fly

Ulivellia inversa is a species of fly in the genus Ulivellia of the family Ulidiidae.
