= Aspistomella heteroptera =

Scientific classification
- Kingdom: Animalia
- Phylum: Arthropoda
- Clade: Pancrustacea
- Class: Insecta
- Order: Diptera
- Family: Ulidiidae
- Genus: Aspistomella
- Species: A. heteroptera

Binomial name
- Aspistomella heteroptera Hendel, 1909

Species of fly

Aspistomella heteroptera is a species of ulidiid or picture-winged fly in the genus Aspistomella of the family Ulidiidae. It was first described by Friedrich Georg Hendel in 1909, based on specimens collected from South America, including from Peru.

The larvae are saprophagous and adapted to an aquatic lifestyle, living in the phytotelma of the culms of bamboo-like grasses, such as Guadua angustifolia. They gain access to these spaces using pre-existing holes bored by caterpillars of the family Crambidae. The last-instar jumps out of the hole, and pupates in the soil.
