= Axiologina ferrumequinum =

Scientific classification
- Kingdom: Animalia
- Phylum: Arthropoda
- Clade: Pancrustacea
- Class: Insecta
- Order: Diptera
- Family: Ulidiidae
- Genus: Axiologina
- Species: A. ferrumequinum

Binomial name
- Axiologina ferrumequinum Hendel, 1909

Synonyms
- Axiologina ferrumeguinum (lapsus); Axiologina ferumequinum (lapsus)

Species of fly

Axiologina ferrumequinum is a species of picture-winged fly in the genus Axiologina of the family Ulidiidae.
