= Terpnomyia angustifrons =

Scientific classification
- Kingdom: Animalia
- Phylum: Arthropoda
- Class: Insecta
- Order: Diptera
- Family: Ulidiidae
- Genus: Terpnomyia
- Species: T. angustifrons

Binomial name
- Terpnomyia angustifrons Hendel, 1909

Species of fly

Terpnomyia angustifrons is a species of ulidiid or picture-winged fly in the genus Terpnomyia of the family Ulidiidae.
