= Systata silvicola =

Scientific classification
- Kingdom: Animalia
- Phylum: Arthropoda
- Class: Insecta
- Order: Diptera
- Family: Ulidiidae
- Genus: Systata
- Species: S. silvicola

Binomial name
- Systata silvicola Rivosecchi, 1993

Species of fly

Systata silvicola is a species of ulidiid or picture-winged fly in the genus Systata of the family Ulidiidae.
