= P. intermedia =

P. intermedia may refer to:

- Pachyaena intermedia, an extinct mammal species in the genus Pachyaena
- Pareuxesta intermedia, a picture-winged fly species
- Pavetta intermedia, a plant species found in the Democratic Republic of the Congo and Uganda
- Pearcea intermedia, a threatened plant species from Ecuador
- Pipreola intermedia, the Band-tailed Fruiteater, a bird species found in Bolivia and Peru
- Plebeia intermedia, a stingless bee species in the genus Plebeia
- Potentilla intermedia, a species of plant in the Potentilla (cinquefoils) genus
- Prevotella intermedia, a gram-negative anaerobic pathogen bacterium species involved in periodontal infections
- Psittacula intermedia, the Intermediate Parakeet or Rothschild's Parakeet, a kind of parakeet reported from the sub-Himalayan region of India

== Synonyms ==
- Pachypasa intermedia, a synonym for Pachypasa limosa, a moth species found in southern France, the Iberian Peninsula and North Africa
- Peniophora intermedia, a synonym for Lopharia crassa, a plant pathogen species

== See also ==
- Intermedia (disambiguation)
