= Chondrometopum leve =

Scientific classification
- Kingdom: Animalia
- Phylum: Arthropoda
- Class: Insecta
- Order: Diptera
- Family: Ulidiidae
- Genus: Chondrometopum
- Species: C. leve

Binomial name
- Chondrometopum leve Hendel, 1914

Species of fly

Chondrometopum leve is a species of ulidiid or picture-winged fly in the genus Chondrometopum of the family Ulidiidae.
