= Homalocephala angustata =

Scientific classification
- Kingdom: Animalia
- Phylum: Arthropoda
- Class: Insecta
- Order: Diptera
- Family: Ulidiidae
- Genus: Homalocephala
- Species: H. angustata

Binomial name
- Homalocephala angustata Wahlberg, 1839

Synonyms
- Psairoptera angustata Wahlberg, 1838

Species of fly

Homalocephala angustata is a species of ulidiid or picture-winged fly in the genus Homalocephala of the family Ulidiidae.
