= Homalocephala bimaculata =

Scientific classification
- Kingdom: Animalia
- Phylum: Arthropoda
- Class: Insecta
- Order: Diptera
- Family: Ulidiidae
- Genus: Homalocephala
- Species: H. bimaculata

Binomial name
- Homalocephala bimaculata Wahlberg, 1839

Synonyms
- Psairoptera bimaculata Wahlberg, 1838

Species of fly

Homalocephala bimaculata is a species of ulidiid or picture-winged fly in the genus Homalocephala of the family Tephritidae.
