= Prionella villosa =

Scientific classification
- Kingdom: Animalia
- Phylum: Arthropoda
- Clade: Pancrustacea
- Class: Insecta
- Order: Diptera
- Family: Ulidiidae
- Genus: Prionella
- Species: P. villosa

Binomial name
- Prionella villosa Robineau-Desvoidy, 1830

Species of fly

Prionella villosa is a species of ulidiid or picture-winged fly in the genus Prionella of the family Tephritidae.
