= Notogramma cactipeodes =

Scientific classification
- Domain: Eukaryota
- Kingdom: Animalia
- Phylum: Arthropoda
- Class: Insecta
- Order: Diptera
- Family: Ulidiidae
- Genus: Notogramma
- Species: N. cactipeodes

Binomial name
- Notogramma cactipeodes Steyskal, 1963

Species of fly

Notogramma cactipeodes is a species of ulidiid or picture-winged fly in the genus Notogramma of the family Tephritidae.
