= Ophthalmoptera undulata =

Scientific classification
- Kingdom: Animalia
- Phylum: Arthropoda
- Class: Insecta
- Order: Diptera
- Family: Ulidiidae
- Genus: Ophthalmoptera
- Species: O. undulata

Binomial name
- Ophthalmoptera undulata Hendel, 1914

Species of insect

Ophthalmoptera undulata is a species of ulidiid or picture-winged fly in the genus Ophthalmoptera of the family Ulidiidae.
