= Tetrapleura =

Tetrapleura may refer to:

- Tetrapleura (fly), a genus of flies in the family Ulidiidae
- Tetrapleura (plant), a genus of plants in the family Fabaceae
