= Homalocephala ozerovi =

Scientific classification
- Kingdom: Animalia
- Phylum: Arthropoda
- Clade: Pancrustacea
- Class: Insecta
- Order: Diptera
- Family: Ulidiidae
- Genus: Homalocephala
- Species: H. ozerovi

Binomial name
- Homalocephala ozerovi Krivosheina & Krivosheina, 1998

Species of fly

Homalocephala ozerovi is a species of ulidiid or picture-winged fly in the genus Homalocephala of the family Ulidiidae.
