= Apterocerina fascipennis =

Scientific classification
- Kingdom: Animalia
- Phylum: Arthropoda
- Clade: Pancrustacea
- Class: Insecta
- Order: Diptera
- Family: Ulidiidae
- Genus: Apterocerina
- Species: A. fascipennis

Binomial name
- Apterocerina fascipennis (Enderlein, 1921)

Synonyms
- Paragorgopsis fascipennis Enderlein, 1921

Species of fly

Apterocerina fascipennis is a species of fly in the genus Apterocerina of the family Ulidiidae.
