= Coscinum clavipes =

Scientific classification
- Kingdom: Animalia
- Phylum: Arthropoda
- Clade: Pancrustacea
- Class: Insecta
- Order: Diptera
- Family: Ulidiidae
- Genus: Coscinum
- Species: C. clavipes

Binomial name
- Coscinum clavipes Hendel, 1909

Species of fly

Coscinum clavipes is a species of fly in the genus Coscinum of the family Ulidiidae.
