= Micropterocerus longifacies =

Scientific classification
- Kingdom: Animalia
- Phylum: Arthropoda
- Clade: Pancrustacea
- Class: Insecta
- Order: Diptera
- Family: Ulidiidae
- Genus: Micropterocerus
- Species: M. longifacies

Binomial name
- Micropterocerus longifacies Hendel, 1914

Species of fly

Micropterocerus longifacies is a species of fly in the genus Micropterocerus in the family Ulidiidae.
