= Stenomyia =

Scientific classification
- Kingdom: Animalia
- Phylum: Arthropoda
- Clade: Pancrustacea
- Class: Insecta
- Order: Diptera
- Family: Ulidiidae
- Subfamily: Ulidiinae
- Genus: Stenomyia; Loew, 1868

Genus of flies

Stenomyia is a genus of ulidiid or picture-winged fly in the family Ulidiidae.

== Species ==
- Stenomyia angusta (Hendel, 1909)
- Stenomyia brooksi (Johnson, 1926)
- Stenomyia fasciapennis Cresson, 1913
- Stenomyia hendeli (Johnson, 1913)
- Stenomyia laticauda (Hendel, 1909)
- Stenomyia tenuissima (Hendel, 1910)
