= Ophthalmoptera longipennis =

Scientific classification
- Kingdom: Animalia
- Phylum: Arthropoda
- Clade: Pancrustacea
- Class: Insecta
- Order: Diptera
- Family: Ulidiidae
- Genus: Ophthalmoptera
- Species: O. longipennis

Binomial name
- Ophthalmoptera longipennis Hendel, 1909

Species of fly

Ophthalmoptera longipennis is a species of ulidiid or picture-winged fly in the genus Ophthalmoptera of the family Ulidiidae.
