= Goniaeola foveolata =

Scientific classification
- Kingdom: Animalia
- Phylum: Arthropoda
- Class: Insecta
- Order: Diptera
- Family: Ulidiidae
- Genus: Goniaeola
- Species: G. foveolata

Binomial name
- Goniaeola foveolata Hendel, 1909

Species of fly

Goniaeola foveolata is a species of picture-winged fly in the family Ulidiidae.
