= Califortalis =

Scientific classification
- Kingdom: Animalia
- Phylum: Arthropoda
- Class: Insecta
- Order: Diptera
- Family: Ulidiidae
- Genus: Califortalis

Genus of flies

Califortalis is a genus of picture-winged flies in the family Ulidiidae.

== Species ==
- C. hirsutifrons
