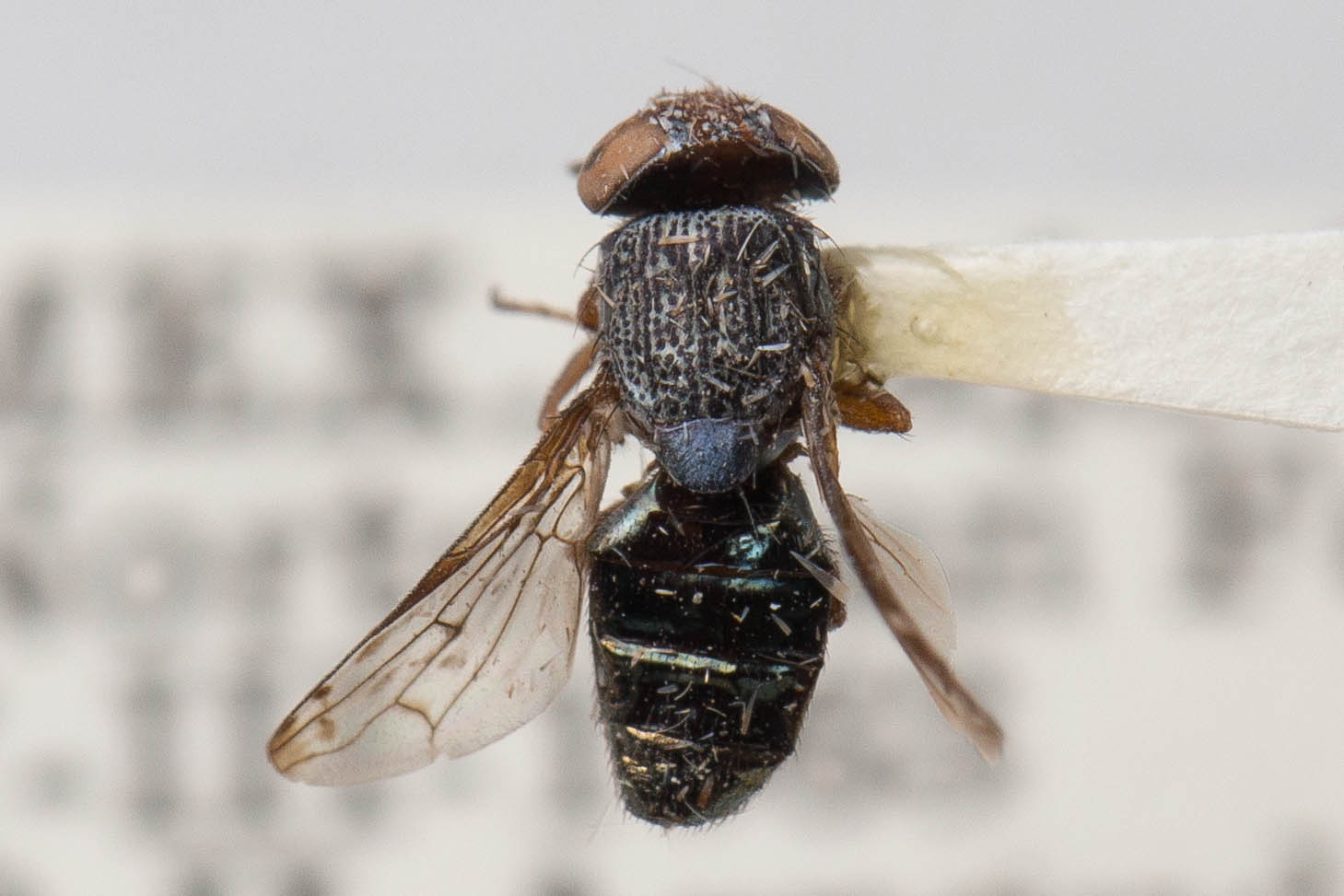

Scientific classification
- Domain: Eukaryota
- Kingdom: Animalia
- Phylum: Arthropoda
- Class: Insecta
- Order: Diptera
- Family: Ulidiidae
- Genus: Notogramma
- Species: N. purpuratum

Binomial name
- Notogramma purpuratum Cole, 1923

= Notogramma purpuratum =

Species of fly

Notogramma purpuratum is a species of ulidiid or picture-winged fly in the genus Notogramma of the family Ulidiidae.
