= Terpnomyia latifrons =

Scientific classification
- Kingdom: Animalia
- Phylum: Arthropoda
- Class: Insecta
- Order: Diptera
- Family: Ulidiidae
- Genus: Terpnomyia
- Species: T. latifrons

Binomial name
- Terpnomyia latifrons Hendel, 1909

Species of fly

Terpnomyia latifrons is a species of ulidiid or picture-winged fly in the genus Terpnomyia of the family Ulidiidae.
