= Megalaemyia elsae =

Scientific classification
- Kingdom: Animalia
- Phylum: Arthropoda
- Class: Insecta
- Order: Diptera
- Family: Ulidiidae
- Genus: Megalaemyia
- Species: M. elsae

Binomial name
- Megalaemyia elsae Hendel, 1909

Species of fly

Megalaemyia elsae is a species of ulidiid or picture-winged fly in the genus Megalaemyia of the family Ulidiidae.
