= Plagiocephalus huberi =

Scientific classification
- Kingdom: Animalia
- Phylum: Arthropoda
- Class: Insecta
- Order: Diptera
- Family: Ulidiidae
- Genus: Plagiocephalus
- Species: P. huberi

Binomial name
- Plagiocephalus huberi Cresson, 1923

Species of insect

Plagiocephalus huberi is a species of ulidiid or picture-winged fly in the genus Plagiocephalus of the family Ulidiidae.
