= Aciuroides insecta =

Scientific classification
- Kingdom: Animalia
- Phylum: Arthropoda
- Class: Insecta
- Order: Diptera
- Family: Ulidiidae
- Genus: Aciuroides
- Species: A. insecta

Binomial name
- Aciuroides insecta Hendel, 1914

Species of fly

Aciuroides insecta is a species of ulidiidae or picture-winged fly in the genus Aciuroides of the family Ulidiidae.
