= Dasymetopa fenestrata =

Scientific classification
- Kingdom: Animalia
- Phylum: Arthropoda
- Clade: Pancrustacea
- Class: Insecta
- Order: Diptera
- Family: Ulidiidae
- Genus: Dasymetopa
- Species: D. fenestrata

Binomial name
- Dasymetopa fenestrata Hendel, 1909

Species of fly

Dasymetopa fenestrata is a species of ulidiid or picture-winged fly in the genus Dasymetopa of the family Ulidiidae.
