= Ophthalmoptera innotata =

Scientific classification
- Kingdom: Animalia
- Phylum: Arthropoda
- Clade: Pancrustacea
- Class: Insecta
- Order: Diptera
- Family: Ulidiidae
- Genus: Ophthalmoptera
- Species: O. innotata

Binomial name
- Ophthalmoptera innotata Enderlein, 1921

Species of fly

Ophthalmoptera innotata is a species of ulidiid or picture-winged fly in the genus Ophthalmoptera of the family Ulidiidae.
