= Neomyennis zebra =

Scientific classification
- Kingdom: Animalia
- Phylum: Arthropoda
- Class: Insecta
- Order: Diptera
- Family: Ulidiidae
- Genus: Neomyennis
- Species: N. zebra

Binomial name
- Neomyennis zebra (Hendel, 1909)

Species of fly

Neomyennis zebra is a species of ulidiid or picture-winged fly in the genus Neomyennis of the family Ulidiidae.
