= Hypoecta longula =

Scientific classification
- Kingdom: Animalia
- Phylum: Arthropoda
- Class: Insecta
- Order: Diptera
- Family: Ulidiidae
- Genus: Hypoecta
- Species: H. longula

Binomial name
- Hypoecta longula Loew, 1868

Species of fly

Hypoecta longula is a species of fly in the genus Hypoecta of the family Ulidiidae. It was described by Hermann Loew in 1868.
