= Pareuxesta latifasciata =

Scientific classification
- Kingdom: Animalia
- Phylum: Arthropoda
- Class: Insecta
- Order: Diptera
- Family: Ulidiidae
- Genus: Pareuxesta
- Species: P. latifasciata

Binomial name
- Pareuxesta latifasciata Coquillett, 1901

Species of fly

Pareuxesta latifasciata is a species of ulidiid or picture-winged fly in the genus Pareuxesta of the family Ulidiidae.
