= Tetrapleura picta =

Scientific classification
- Kingdom: Animalia
- Phylum: Arthropoda
- Class: Insecta
- Order: Diptera
- Family: Ulidiidae
- Genus: Tetrapleura
- Species: T. picta

Binomial name
- Tetrapleura picta Schiner, 1868

Species of fly

Tetrapleura picta is a species of ulidiid or picture-winged fly in the genus Tetrapleura of the family Ulidiidae.
