= Cymatozus bestifer =

Scientific classification
- Kingdom: Animalia
- Phylum: Arthropoda
- Clade: Pancrustacea
- Class: Insecta
- Order: Diptera
- Family: Ulidiidae
- Genus: Cymatozus
- Species: C. bestifer

Binomial name
- Cymatozus bestifer (Hendel, 1909)

Synonyms
- Megalaemyia bestifer Hendel, 1909

Species of fly

Cymatozus bestifer is a species of ulidiid or picture-winged fly in the genus Cymatozus of the family Ulidiidae.
