= Aspistomella lobioptera =

Scientific classification
- Domain: Eukaryota
- Kingdom: Animalia
- Phylum: Arthropoda
- Class: Insecta
- Order: Diptera
- Family: Ulidiidae
- Genus: Aspistomella
- Species: A. lobioptera

Binomial name
- Aspistomella lobioptera Hendel, 1909

Species of fly

Aspistomella lobioptera is a species of ulidiidae or picture-winged fly in the genus Aspistomella of the family Ulidiidae.
