= Pseudoseioptera dubiosa =

Scientific classification
- Kingdom: Animalia
- Phylum: Arthropoda
- Class: Insecta
- Order: Diptera
- Family: Ulidiidae
- Genus: Pseudoseioptera
- Species: P. dubiosa

Binomial name
- Pseudoseioptera dubiosa (Johnson, 1921)

Synonyms
- Seioptera dubiosa Johnson, 1921

Species of fly

Pseudoseioptera dubiosa is a species of ulidiid or picture-winged fly in the family Ulidiidae. It is known from Maine.

Pseudoseioptera dubiosa measure 5 mm (0.20 in) in length.
