= Eumetopiella rufipes =

Scientific classification
- Kingdom: Animalia
- Phylum: Arthropoda
- Class: Insecta
- Order: Diptera
- Family: Ulidiidae
- Genus: Eumetopiella
- Species: E. rufipes

Binomial name
- Eumetopiella rufipes (Macquart, 1847)

Species of fly

Eumetopiella rufipes is a species of ulidiid or picture-winged fly in the genus Eumetopiella of the family Ulidiidae.
