= Apterocerina argentea =

Scientific classification
- Domain: Eukaryota
- Kingdom: Animalia
- Phylum: Arthropoda
- Class: Insecta
- Order: Diptera
- Family: Ulidiidae
- Genus: Apterocerina
- Species: A. argentea

Binomial name
- Apterocerina argentea Hendel, 1914

Species of fly

Apterocerina argentea is a species of ulidiidae or picture-winged fly in the genus Apterocerina of the family Ulidiidae.
