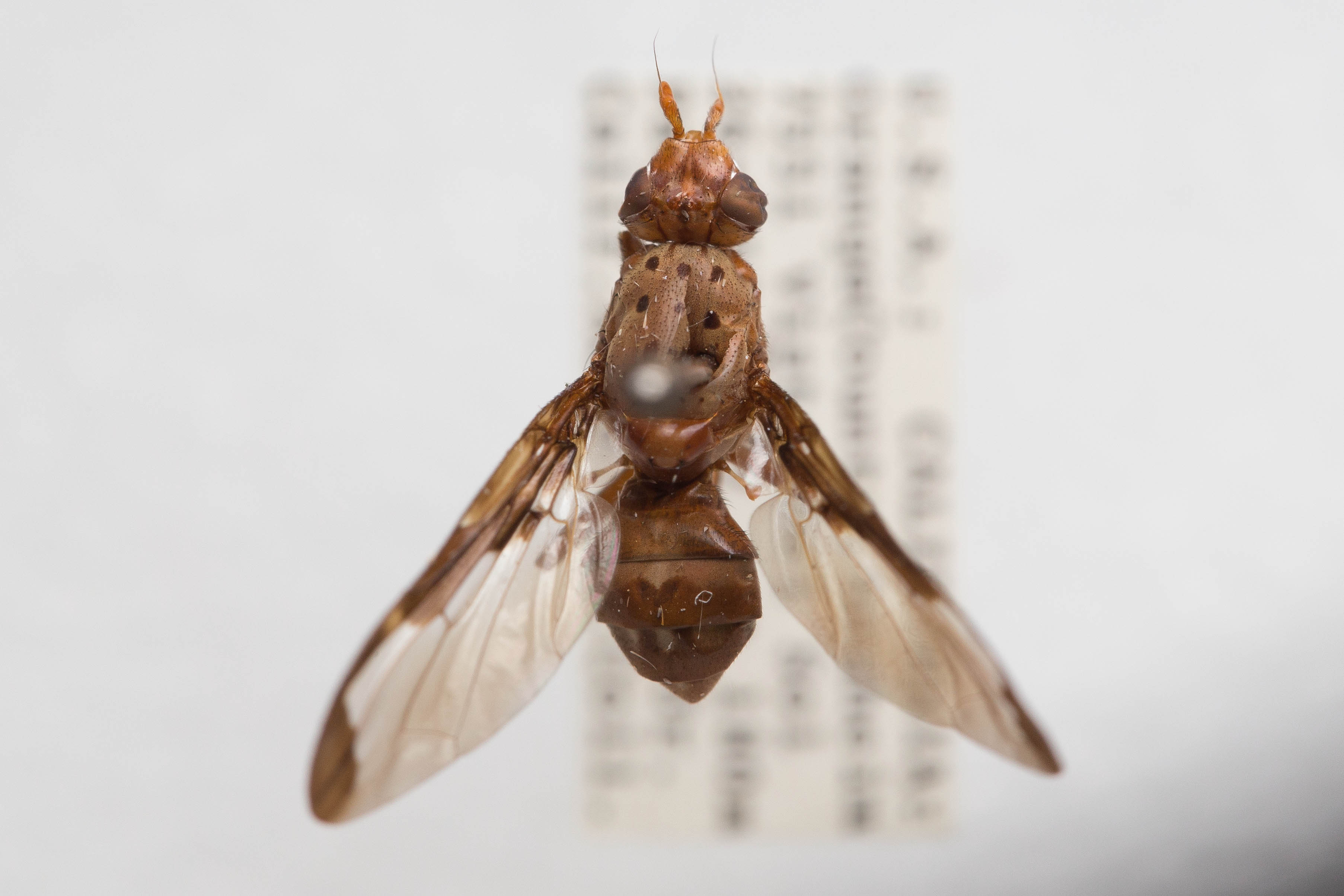

Scientific classification
- Kingdom: Animalia
- Phylum: Arthropoda
- Clade: Pancrustacea
- Class: Insecta
- Order: Diptera
- Family: Ulidiidae
- Genus: Diacrita
- Species: D. costalis

Binomial name
- Diacrita costalis Gerstaecker, 1860

Synonyms
- Carlottaemyia moerens Bigot, 1877; Diacrita aemula Loew, 1873

= Diacrita costalis =

Species of fly

Diacrita costalis is a species of ulidiid or picture-winged fly in the genus Diacrita of the family Tephritidae.
