= Prionella beauvoisii =

Scientific classification
- Kingdom: Animalia
- Phylum: Arthropoda
- Class: Insecta
- Order: Diptera
- Family: Ulidiidae
- Genus: Prionella
- Species: P. beauvoisii

Binomial name
- Prionella beauvoisii Robineau-Desvoidy, 1830

Species of fly

Prionella beauvoisii is a species of ulidiid or picture-winged fly in the genus Prionella of the family Ulidiidae.
