= Notogramma cimiciformis =

Scientific classification
- Domain: Eukaryota
- Kingdom: Animalia
- Phylum: Arthropoda
- Class: Insecta
- Order: Diptera
- Family: Ulidiidae
- Genus: Notogramma
- Species: N. cimiciformis

Binomial name
- Notogramma cimiciformis Loew, 1868

Species of fly

Notogramma cimiciformis, sometimes Notogramma cimiciforme, is a species of ulidiid or picture-winged fly in the genus Notogramma of the family Ulidiidae.
