= Blainvillia palpata =

Scientific classification
- Kingdom: Animalia
- Phylum: Arthropoda
- Clade: Pancrustacea
- Class: Insecta
- Order: Diptera
- Family: Ulidiidae
- Genus: Blainvillia
- Species: B. palpata

Binomial name
- Blainvillia palpata Robineau-Desvoidy, 1830

Species of fly

Blainvillia palpata is a species of fly in the genus Blainvillia of the family Ulidiidae.
