= Zacompsia fulva =

Scientific classification
- Kingdom: Animalia
- Phylum: Arthropoda
- Class: Insecta
- Order: Diptera
- Family: Ulidiidae
- Genus: Zacompsia
- Species: Z. fulva

Binomial name
- Zacompsia fulva Coquillett, 1901

Species of fly

Zacompsia fulva is a species of picture-winged fly in the genus Zacompsia of the family Ulidiidae.
