= Megalaemyia costalis =

Scientific classification
- Kingdom: Animalia
- Phylum: Arthropoda
- Class: Insecta
- Order: Diptera
- Family: Ulidiidae
- Genus: Megalaemyia
- Species: M. costalis

Binomial name
- Megalaemyia costalis Hendel, 1909

Species of fly

Megalaemyia costalis is a species of ulidiid or picture-winged fly in the genus Megalaemyia of the family Tephritidae.
