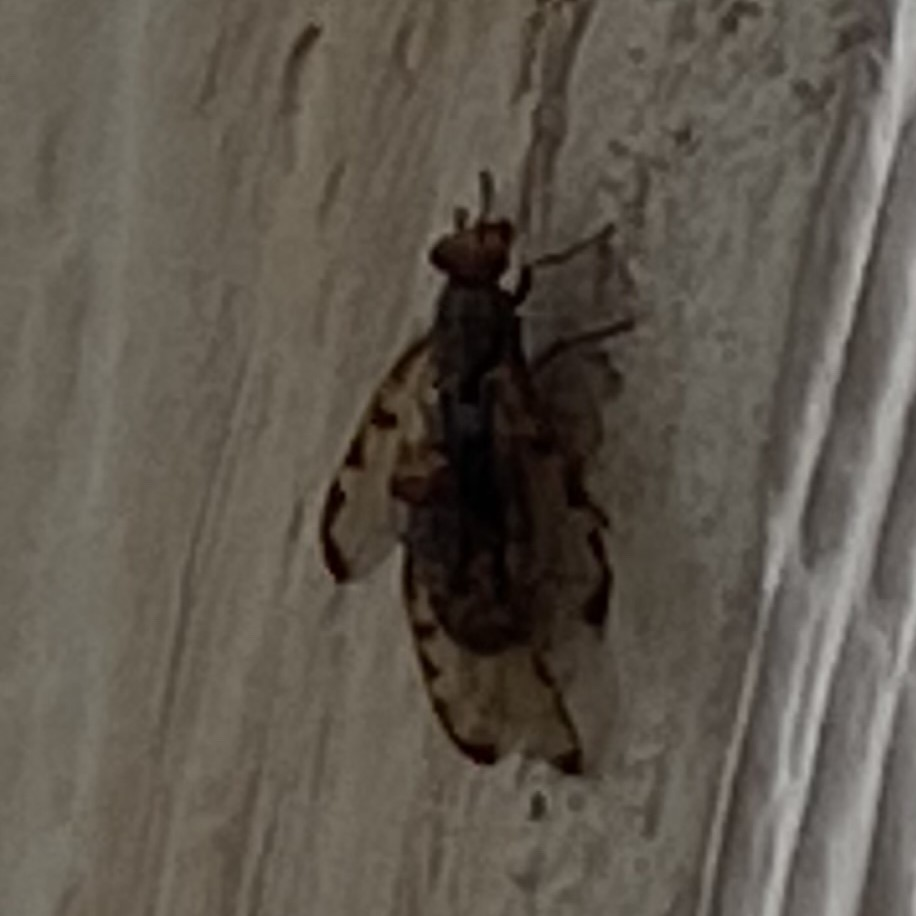

Scientific classification
- Kingdom: Animalia
- Phylum: Arthropoda
- Clade: Pancrustacea
- Class: Insecta
- Order: Diptera
- Family: Ulidiidae
- Genus: Diacrita
- Species: D. plana

Binomial name
- Diacrita plana Steyskal, 1947

= Diacrita plana =

Species of fly

Diacrita plana is a species of ulidiid or picture-winged fly in the family Ulidiidae.
