= Rhyparella decempunctata =

Scientific classification
- Kingdom: Animalia
- Phylum: Arthropoda
- Class: Insecta
- Order: Diptera
- Family: Ulidiidae
- Genus: Rhyparella
- Species: R. decempunctata

Binomial name
- Rhyparella decempunctata Hendel, 1909

Species of fly

Rhyparella decempunctata is a species of ulidiid or picture-winged fly in the genus Rhyparella of the family Tephritidae.
