= Texasa chaetifrons =

Scientific classification
- Kingdom: Animalia
- Phylum: Arthropoda
- Class: Insecta
- Order: Diptera
- Family: Ulidiidae
- Genus: Texasa
- Species: T. chaetifrons

Binomial name
- Texasa chaetifrons Steyskal, 1961

Species of fly

Texasa chaetifrons is a species of picture-winged fly in the genus Texasa of the family Ulidiidae.
