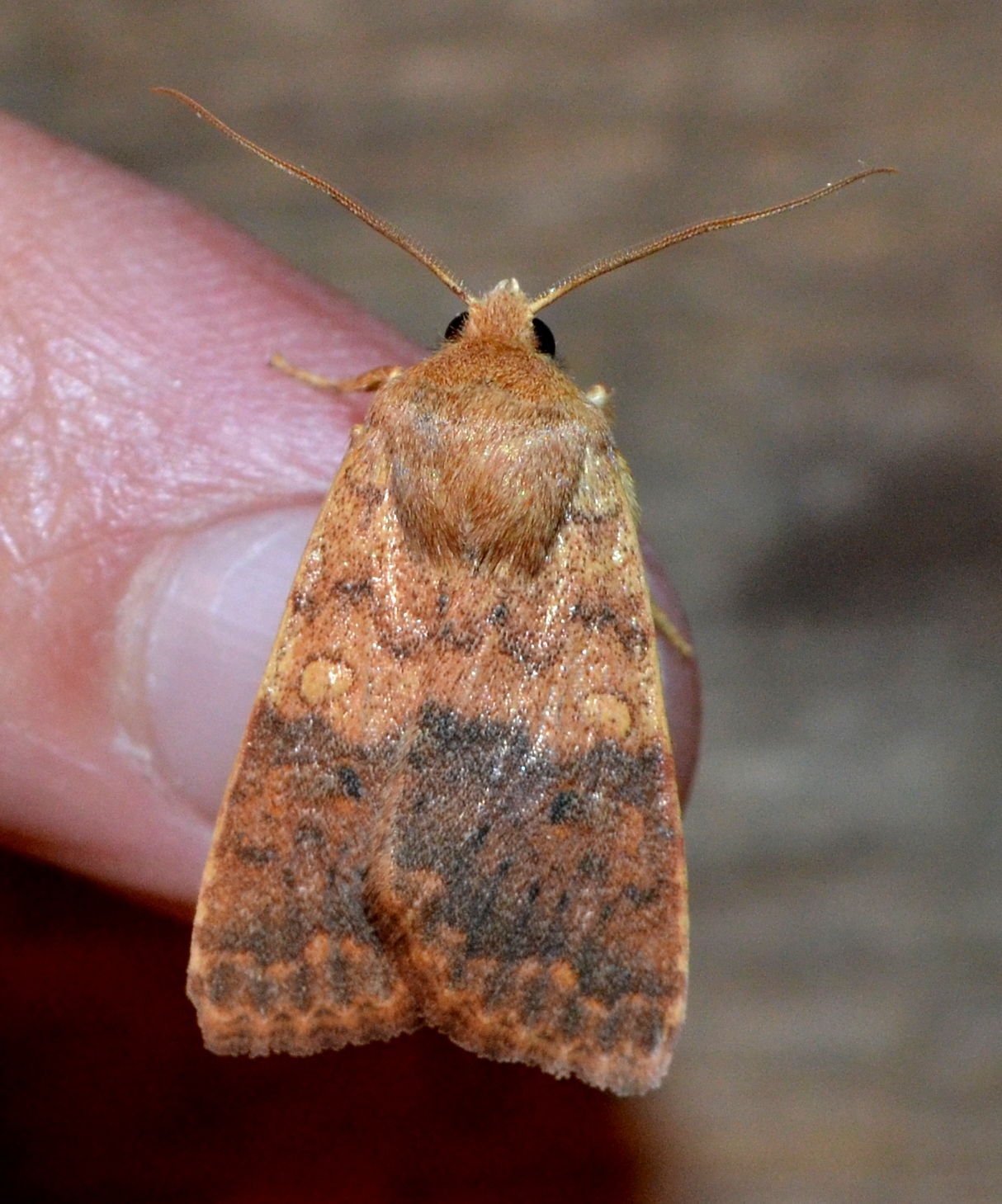

Scientific classification
- Kingdom: Animalia
- Phylum: Arthropoda
- Class: Insecta
- Order: Diptera
- Family: Ulidiidae
- Genus: Xanthacrona
- Species: X. phyllochaeta

Binomial name
- Xanthacrona phyllochaeta Hendel, 1909

= Xanthacrona phyllochaeta =

Species of fly

Xanthacrona phyllochaeta is a species of ulidiid or picture-winged fly in the genus Xanthacrona of the family Ulidiidae.
