= Apterocerina necta =

Scientific classification
- Kingdom: Animalia
- Phylum: Arthropoda
- Class: Insecta
- Order: Diptera
- Family: Ulidiidae
- Genus: Apterocerina
- Species: A. necta

Binomial name
- Apterocerina necta Hendel, 1914

Species of fly

Apterocerina necta is a species of ulidiid or picture-winged fly in the genus Apterocerina of the family Ulidiidae.
