= Acrostictomyia longistigma =

Scientific classification
- Domain: Eukaryota
- Kingdom: Animalia
- Phylum: Arthropoda
- Class: Insecta
- Order: Diptera
- Family: Ulidiidae
- Genus: Acrostictomyia
- Species: A. longistigma

Binomial name
- Acrostictomyia longistigma Blanchard, 1938

Species of fly

Acrostictomyia longistigma is a species of ulidiidae or picture-winged fly in the genus Acrostictomyia of the family Ulidiidae.
