= Eupterocerina =

Scientific classification
- Kingdom: Animalia
- Phylum: Arthropoda
- Class: Insecta
- Order: Diptera
- Family: Ulidiidae
- Subfamily: Ulidiinae
- Genus: Eupterocerina

Genus of flies

Eupterocerina is a genus of picture-winged flies in the family Ulidiidae.

== Species ==
- E. conjuncta
