= Xanthacrona bipustulata =

Scientific classification
- Kingdom: Animalia
- Phylum: Arthropoda
- Class: Insecta
- Order: Diptera
- Family: Ulidiidae
- Genus: Xanthacrona
- Species: X. bipustulata

Binomial name
- Xanthacrona bipustulata Wulp, 1899

Species of fly

Xanthacrona bipustulata is a species of ulidiid or picture-winged fly in the genus Xanthacrona of the family Ulidiidae.
