= Plagiocephalus lobularis =

Scientific classification
- Kingdom: Animalia
- Phylum: Arthropoda
- Clade: Pancrustacea
- Class: Insecta
- Order: Diptera
- Family: Ulidiidae
- Genus: Plagiocephalus
- Species: P. lobularis

Binomial name
- Plagiocephalus lobularis Wiedemann, 1830

Synonyms
- Eupterocerina conjuncta Blanchard, 1938; Ophryoterpnomyia zikani Capoor, 1954; Paragoniaeola tanycephala Blanchard, 1938

Species of fly

Plagiocephalus lobularis is a species of ulidiid or picture-winged fly in the genus Plagiocephalus of the family Ulidiidae.
