= Pseudoseioptera albipes =

Scientific classification
- Kingdom: Animalia
- Phylum: Arthropoda
- Class: Insecta
- Order: Diptera
- Family: Ulidiidae
- Genus: Pseudoseioptera
- Species: P. albipes

Binomial name
- Pseudoseioptera albipes (Cresson, 1919)

Synonyms
- Seioptera albipes Cresson, 1919; Seioptera currani Harriot, 1942

Species of fly

Pseudoseioptera albipes is a species of ulidiid or picture-winged fly in the family Ulidiidae. It occurs in eastern North America.
