= Terpnomyia nitens =

Scientific classification
- Kingdom: Animalia
- Phylum: Arthropoda
- Class: Insecta
- Order: Diptera
- Family: Ulidiidae
- Genus: Terpnomyia
- Species: T. nitens

Binomial name
- Terpnomyia nitens Hendel, 1909

Species of fly

Terpnomyia nitens is a species of ulidiid or picture-winged fly in the genus Terpnomyia of the family Ulidiidae.
