= Dasymetopa lutulenta =

Scientific classification
- Kingdom: Animalia
- Phylum: Arthropoda
- Clade: Pancrustacea
- Class: Insecta
- Order: Diptera
- Family: Ulidiidae
- Genus: Dasymetopa
- Species: D. lutulenta

Binomial name
- Dasymetopa lutulenta Loew, 1868

Species of fly

Dasymetopa lutulenta is a species of ulidiid or picture-winged fly in the genus Dasymetopa of the family Tephritidae.
