= Lathrostigma limbatofasciata =

Scientific classification
- Kingdom: Animalia
- Phylum: Arthropoda
- Clade: Pancrustacea
- Class: Insecta
- Order: Diptera
- Family: Ulidiidae
- Genus: Lathrostigma
- Species: L. limbatofasciata

Binomial name
- Lathrostigma limbatofasciata Enderlein, 1921

Species of fly

Lathrostigma limbatofasciata is a species of ulidiid or picture-winged fly in the genus Lathrostigma of the family Tephritidae.
