= Perissoza scripta =

Scientific classification
- Kingdom: Animalia
- Phylum: Arthropoda
- Clade: Pancrustacea
- Class: Insecta
- Order: Diptera
- Family: Ulidiidae
- Genus: Perissoza
- Species: P. scripta

Binomial name
- Perissoza scripta Enderlein, 1921

Species of fly

Perissoza scripta is a species of fly in the genus Perissoza of the family Ulidiidae.
