= Xanthacrona tuberosa =

Scientific classification
- Kingdom: Animalia
- Phylum: Arthropoda
- Class: Insecta
- Order: Diptera
- Family: Ulidiidae
- Genus: Xanthacrona
- Species: X. tuberosa

Binomial name
- Xanthacrona tuberosa Cresson, 1908

Species of fly

Xanthacrona tuberosa is a species of ulidiid or picture-winged fly in the genus Xanthacrona of the family Ulidiidae.
