= Apterocerina excellens =

Scientific classification
- Kingdom: Animalia
- Phylum: Arthropoda
- Clade: Pancrustacea
- Class: Insecta
- Order: Diptera
- Family: Ulidiidae
- Genus: Apterocerina
- Species: A. excellens

Binomial name
- Apterocerina excellens (Enderlein, 1921)

Synonyms
- Paragorgopsis excellens Enderlein, 1921

Species of fly

Apterocerina excellens is a species of fly in the genus Apterocerina of the family Ulidiidae.
