= Schnusimyia parvula =

Scientific classification
- Kingdom: Animalia
- Phylum: Arthropoda
- Clade: Pancrustacea
- Class: Insecta
- Order: Diptera
- Family: Ulidiidae
- Genus: Schnusimyia
- Species: S. parvula

Binomial name
- Schnusimyia parvula Hendel, 1914

Species of fly

Schnusimyia parvula is a species of fly in the genus Schnusimyia of the family Ulidiidae.
