= Zacompsia planiceps =

Scientific classification
- Kingdom: Animalia
- Phylum: Arthropoda
- Clade: Pancrustacea
- Class: Insecta
- Order: Diptera
- Family: Ulidiidae
- Genus: Zacompsia
- Species: Z. planiceps

Binomial name
- Zacompsia planiceps (Enderlein, 1927)

Species of fly

Zacompsia planiceps is a species of fly in the genus Zacompsia of the family Ulidiidae.
