= Vespomima nigrotaenia =

Scientific classification
- Kingdom: Animalia
- Phylum: Arthropoda
- Clade: Pancrustacea
- Class: Insecta
- Order: Diptera
- Family: Ulidiidae
- Genus: Vespomima
- Species: V. nigrotaenia

Binomial name
- Vespomima nigrotaenia Enderlein, 1927

Species of fly

Vespomima nigrotaenia is a species of fly in the genus Vespomima of the family Ulidiidae.
