= Megalaemyia albostriata =

Scientific classification
- Kingdom: Animalia
- Phylum: Arthropoda
- Class: Insecta
- Order: Diptera
- Family: Ulidiidae
- Genus: Megalaemyia
- Species: M. albostriata

Binomial name
- Megalaemyia albostriata Hendel, 1909

Species of fly

Megalaemyia albostriata is a species of ulidiid or picture-winged fly in the genus Megalaemyia of the family Ulidiidae.
