= Pareuxesta academica =

Scientific classification
- Domain: Eukaryota
- Kingdom: Animalia
- Phylum: Arthropoda
- Class: Insecta
- Order: Diptera
- Family: Ulidiidae
- Genus: Pareuxesta
- Species: P. academica

Binomial name
- Pareuxesta academica Steyskal, 1966

Species of fly

Pareuxesta academica is a species of ulidiid or picture-winged fly in the genus Pareuxesta of the family Ulidiidae.
