= Aspistomella angustifrons =

Scientific classification
- Kingdom: Animalia
- Phylum: Arthropoda
- Clade: Pancrustacea
- Class: Insecta
- Order: Diptera
- Family: Ulidiidae
- Genus: Aspistomella
- Species: A. angustifrons

Binomial name
- Aspistomella angustifrons (Hendel, 1909)

Synonyms
- Paraphyola angustifrons Hendel, 1909

Species of fly

Aspistomella angustifrons is a species of ulidiid or picture-winged fly in the genus Aspistomella of the family Ulidiidae.
