= Euxestina similis =

Scientific classification
- Kingdom: Animalia
- Phylum: Arthropoda
- Clade: Pancrustacea
- Class: Insecta
- Order: Diptera
- Family: Ulidiidae
- Genus: Euxestina
- Species: E. similis

Binomial name
- Euxestina similis Enderlein, 1937

Species of fly

Euxestina similis is a species of ulidiid or picture-winged fly in the genus Euxestina of the family Ulidiidae.
