= Elapata remipes =

Scientific classification
- Kingdom: Animalia
- Phylum: Arthropoda
- Class: Insecta
- Order: Diptera
- Family: Ulidiidae
- Genus: Elapata
- Species: E. remipes

Binomial name
- Elapata remipes Hendel, 1909

Species of fly

Elapata remipes is a species of ulidiid or picture-winged fly in the genus Elapata of the family Ulidiidae.
