= Neoeuxesta fumicosta =

Scientific classification
- Domain: Eukaryota
- Kingdom: Animalia
- Phylum: Arthropoda
- Class: Insecta
- Order: Diptera
- Family: Ulidiidae
- Genus: Neoeuxesta
- Species: N. fumicosta

Binomial name
- Neoeuxesta fumicosta Malloch, 1930

Species of fly

Neoeuxesta fumicosta is a species of ulidiid, or picture-winged, fly in the genus Neoeuxesta; it is found in Samoa.
