= Eumetopiella =

Scientific classification
- Kingdom: Animalia
- Phylum: Arthropoda
- Class: Insecta
- Order: Diptera
- Family: Ulidiidae
- Subfamily: Ulidiinae
- Tribe: Lipsanini
- Genus: Eumetopiella; Hendel, 1907

Genus of flies

Eumetopiella is a genus of picture-winged flies in the family Ulidiidae.

== Species ==
- Eumetopiella engeli
- Eumetopiella fascipennis
- Eumetopiella rufipes
- Eumetopiella varipes
