= Blainvillia =

Scientific classification
- Kingdom: Animalia
- Phylum: Arthropoda
- Class: Insecta
- Order: Diptera
- Family: Ulidiidae
- Genus: Blainvillia

Genus of flies

Blainvillia is a genus of picture-winged flies in the family Ulidiidae. Some authors have considered it identical to the genera Mactrinula and Harvella.

== Species ==
- B. palpata
