= Systata =

Scientific classification
- Kingdom: Animalia
- Phylum: Arthropoda
- Clade: Pancrustacea
- Class: Insecta
- Order: Diptera
- Family: Ulidiidae
- Genus: Systata; Loew, 1868

Genus of flies

Systata is a genus of picture-winged flies in the family Ulidiidae. Its larvae are scavengers on decaying organic matters.

== Species ==
- Systata angustata
- Systata obliqua
- Systata silvicola
