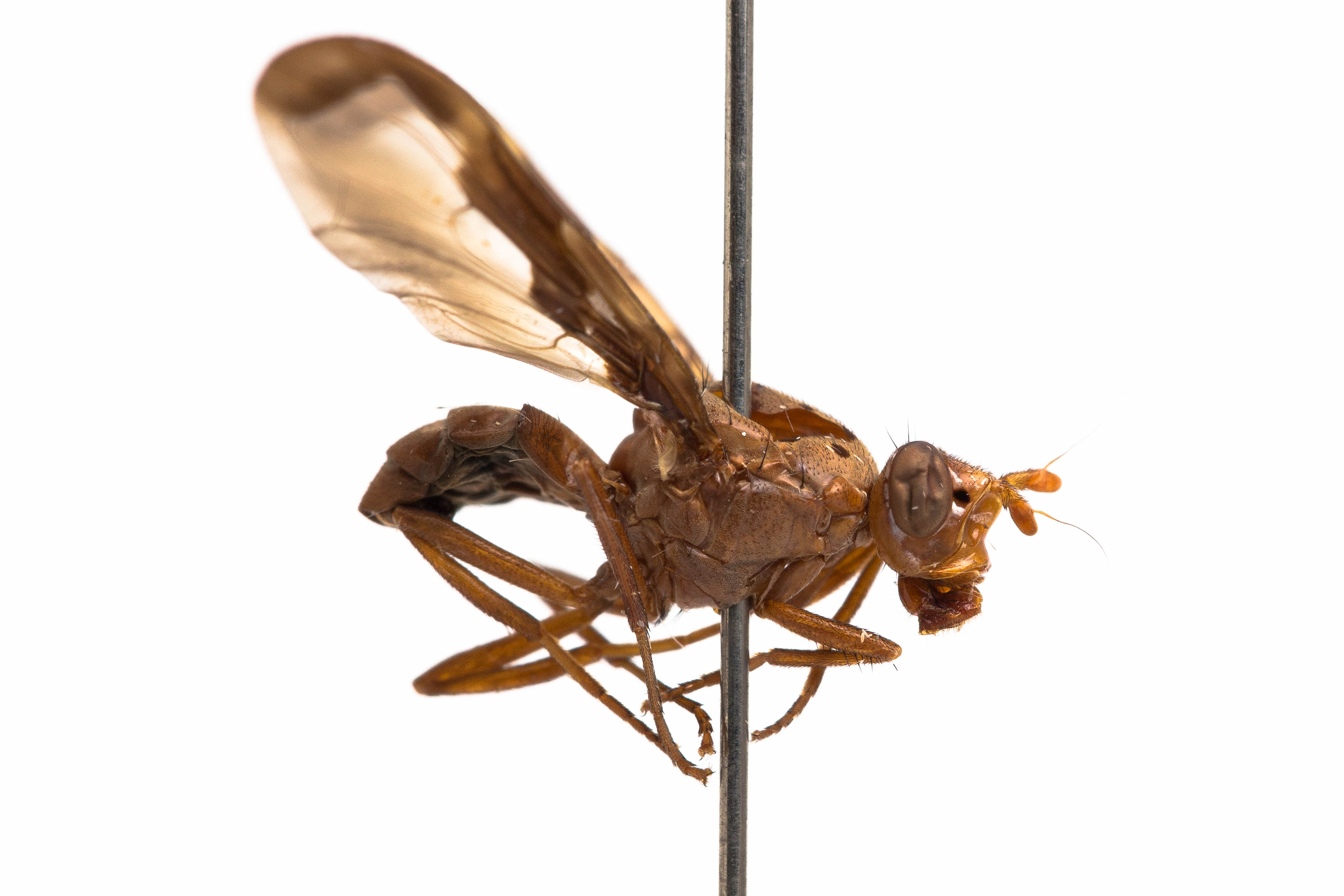
- Diacrita costalis

Scientific classification
- Kingdom: Animalia
- Phylum: Arthropoda
- Clade: Pancrustacea
- Class: Insecta
- Order: Diptera
- Family: Ulidiidae
- Subfamily: Otitinae
- Tribe: Otitini
- Genus: Diacrita; Gerstaecker, 1860

Synonyms
- Carlottaemyia Bigot, 1877

= Diacrita =

Genus of flies

Diacrita is a genus of picture-winged flies in the family Ulidiidae.

== Species ==
- Diacrita costalis Gerstaecker, 1860
- Diacrita plana Steyskal, 1947

Synonyms

- Diacrita aemula Loew, 1873; valid as D. costalis
