= Chondrometopum =

Scientific classification
- Kingdom: Animalia
- Phylum: Arthropoda
- Clade: Pancrustacea
- Class: Insecta
- Order: Diptera
- Family: Ulidiidae
- Subfamily: Ulidiinae
- Tribe: Pterocallini
- Genus: Chondrometopum; Hendel, 1909

Genus of picture-winged flies

Chondrometopum is a genus of picture-winged flies in the family Ulidiidae.

== Species ==
- Chondrometopum arcuatum Hendel, 1909
- Chondrometopum bifenestratum Kertész, 1913
- Chondrometopum leve Hendel, 1914
