= Aciuroides =

Scientific classification
- Kingdom: Animalia
- Phylum: Arthropoda
- Clade: Pancrustacea
- Class: Insecta
- Order: Diptera
- Family: Ulidiidae
- Subfamily: Ulidiinae
- Genus: Aciuroides; Hendel, 1914

Type species
- Aciuroides insecta Hendel, 1914

Genus of flies

Aciuroides is a genus of ulidiid or picture-winged fly in the family Ulidiidae.

== Species ==
- Aciuroides fasciata Hering, 1941
- Aciuroides insecta Hendel, 1914
- Aciuroides plaumanni Hering, 1941
