= Apterocerina =

Scientific classification
- Kingdom: Animalia
- Phylum: Arthropoda
- Clade: Pancrustacea
- Class: Insecta
- Order: Diptera
- Family: Ulidiidae
- Subfamily: Ulidiinae
- Tribe: Pterocallini
- Genus: Apterocerina; Hendel, 1914

Genus of flies

Apterocerina is a genus of picture-winged flies in the family Ulidiidae.

== Species ==
- Apterocerina amoena (Enderlein, 1921)
- Apterocerina argentea Hendel, 1914
- Apterocerina excellens (Enderlein, 1921)
- Apterocerina fascipennis (Enderlein, 1921)
- Apterocerina necta Hendel, 1914
