= Schnusimyia =

Scientific classification
- Kingdom: Animalia
- Phylum: Arthropoda
- Class: Insecta
- Order: Diptera
- Family: Ulidiidae
- Genus: Schnusimyia

Genus of flies

Schnusimyia is a genus of picture-winged flies in the family Ulidiidae.

== Species ==
- S. parvula
