= Zacompsia =

Scientific classification
- Kingdom: Animalia
- Phylum: Arthropoda
- Class: Insecta
- Order: Diptera
- Family: Ulidiidae
- Subfamily: Ulidiinae
- Tribe: Lipsanini
- Genus: Zacompsia; Coquillett, 1901

Type species
- Zacompsia fulva Coquillett, 1901

Synonyms
- Metopocampta Enderlein, 1927

Genus of flies

Zacompsia is a genus of picture-winged flies in the family Ulidiidae.

== Species ==
- Zacompsia colorata Steyskal, 1971
- Zacompsia fulva Coquillett, 1901
- Zacompsia metallica
- Zacompsia planiceps Enderlein, 1927
