= Plagiocephalus =

Scientific classification
- Kingdom: Animalia
- Phylum: Arthropoda
- Clade: Pancrustacea
- Class: Insecta
- Order: Diptera
- Family: Ulidiidae
- Subfamily: Ulidiinae
- Tribe: Pterocallini
- Genus: Plagiocephalus; Wiedemann, 1830

Synonyms
- Eupterocerina Blanchard, 1938; Paragoniaeola Blanchard, 1938; Phagiocephalus Wiedemann, 1830; Plagiocephala Macquart, 1843; Ophryoterpnomyia Hendel, 1936; Stylophthalmyia Frey, 1926; Willineria Blanchard, 1951

Genus of flies

Plagiocephalus is a genus of picture-winged flies in the family Ulidiidae.

== Species ==
- Plagiocephalus huberi
- Plagiocephalus intermedius
- Plagiocephalus latifrons
- Plagiocephalus lobularis
