= Heterodoxa =

Scientific classification
- Kingdom: Animalia
- Phylum: Arthropoda
- Class: Insecta
- Order: Diptera
- Family: Ulidiidae
- Subfamily: Ulidiinae
- Tribe: Lipsanini
- Genus: Heterodoxa; Malloch, 1932

Genus of flies

Heterodoxa is a genus of picture-winged flies in the family Ulidiidae.

== Species ==
- Heterodoxa fatuhivae
- Heterodoxa hivaoae
- Heterodoxa uahukae
- Heterodoxa uapouae
