= Cymatozus =

Scientific classification
- Kingdom: Animalia
- Phylum: Arthropoda
- Clade: Pancrustacea
- Class: Insecta
- Order: Diptera
- Family: Ulidiidae
- Subfamily: Ulidiinae
- Tribe: Pterocallini
- Genus: Cymatozus; Enderlein, 1912

Genus of flies

Cymatozus is a genus of picture-winged flies in the family Ulidiidae.

== Species ==
It contains the following species:

- Cymatozus bestifer (Hendel, 1909)
- Cymatozus fenestellatus (Hendel, 1909)
- Cymatozus icarus Kameneva, 2009
- Cymatozus marginatus Hendel, 1909
- Cymatozus polymorphomyiodes Enderlein, 1912
