= Hypoecta =

Scientific classification
- Kingdom: Animalia
- Phylum: Arthropoda
- Class: Insecta
- Order: Diptera
- Family: Ulidiidae
- Subfamily: Ulidiinae
- Genus: Hypoecta

Genus of flies

Hypoecta is a mono-specific genus of picture-winged flies in the family Ulidiidae. It was established by Hermann Loew in 1867.

== Species ==
- H. longula
