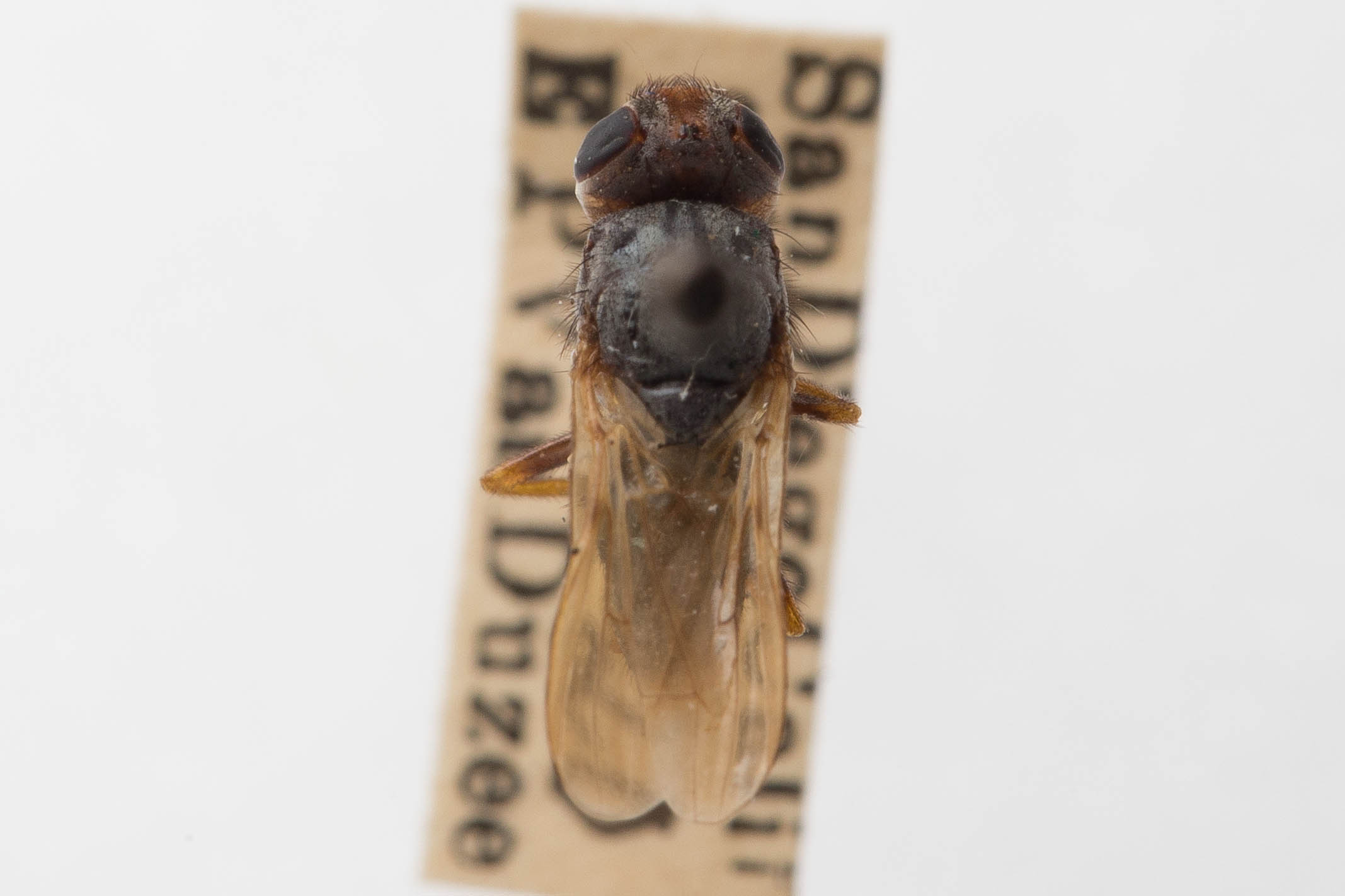

Scientific classification
- Kingdom: Animalia
- Phylum: Arthropoda
- Class: Insecta
- Order: Diptera
- Family: Ulidiidae
- Genus: Tetropismenus
- Species: T. hirtus

Binomial name
- Tetropismenus hirtus Loew, 1876

Synonyms
- Califortalis hirsutifrons Curran, 1934

= Tetropismenus hirtus =

Species of fly

Tetropismenus hirtus is a species of ulidiid or picture-winged fly in the genus Tetropismenus of the family Ulidiidae.
