= Xanthacrona =

Scientific classification
- Kingdom: Animalia
- Phylum: Arthropoda
- Class: Insecta
- Order: Diptera
- Family: Ulidiidae
- Subfamily: Ulidiinae
- Tribe: Pterocallini
- Genus: Xanthacrona; Wulp, 1899

Genus of flies

Xanthacrona is a genus of picture-winged flies in the family Ulidiidae.

== Species ==
- Xanthacrona bipustulata
- Xanthacrona phyllochaeta
- Xanthacrona tripustulata
- Xanthacrona tuberosa
- Xanthacrona ypsilon
