= Ophthalmoptera =

Scientific classification
- Kingdom: Animalia
- Phylum: Arthropoda
- Class: Insecta
- Order: Diptera
- Family: Ulidiidae
- Subfamily: Ulidiinae
- Tribe: Pterocallini
- Genus: Ophthalmoptera; Hendel, 1909

Genus of flies

Ophthalmoptera is a genus of picture-winged flies. The genus was described by Austrian entomologist Friedrich Hendel in 1909. These flies are part of the subfamily Ulidiinae and the tribe Pterocallini.

== Species ==
- Ophthalmoptera bipunctata
- Ophthalmoptera elegans
- Ophthalmoptera innotata
- Ophthalmoptera longipennis
- Ophthalmoptera undulata
