= Dasymetopa =

Scientific classification
- Kingdom: Animalia
- Phylum: Arthropoda
- Clade: Pancrustacea
- Class: Insecta
- Order: Diptera
- Family: Ulidiidae
- Subfamily: Ulidiinae
- Tribe: Pterocallini
- Genus: Dasymetopa; Loew, 1868

Genus of flies

Dasymetopa is a genus of picture-winged flies in the family Ulidiidae.

== Species ==
- Dasymetopa fenestrata Hendel, 1909
- Dasymetopa fumipennis Hendel, 1909
- Dasymetopa luteipennis Hendel, 1909
- Dasymetopa lutulenta Loew, 1868
- Dasymetopa nigropunctata Hendel, 1909
- Dasymetopa ochracea Hendel, 1909
- Dasymetopa quinquepunctata Hendel, 1911
- Dasymetopa septempunctata Hendel, 1909
- Dasymetopa sordida Hendel, 1909
