= Neomyennis =

Scientific classification
- Kingdom: Animalia
- Phylum: Arthropoda
- Class: Insecta
- Order: Diptera
- Family: Ulidiidae
- Subfamily: Ulidiinae
- Tribe: Pterocallini
- Genus: Neomyennis; Hendel, 1914

Genus of flies

Neomyennis is a genus of picture-winged flies in the family Ulidiidae.

== Species ==
- Neomyennis appendiculata (Hendel, 1909)
- Neomyennis cyaneiventris (Hendel, 1909)
- Neomyennis nigra (Hendel, 1909)
- Neomyennis zebra
