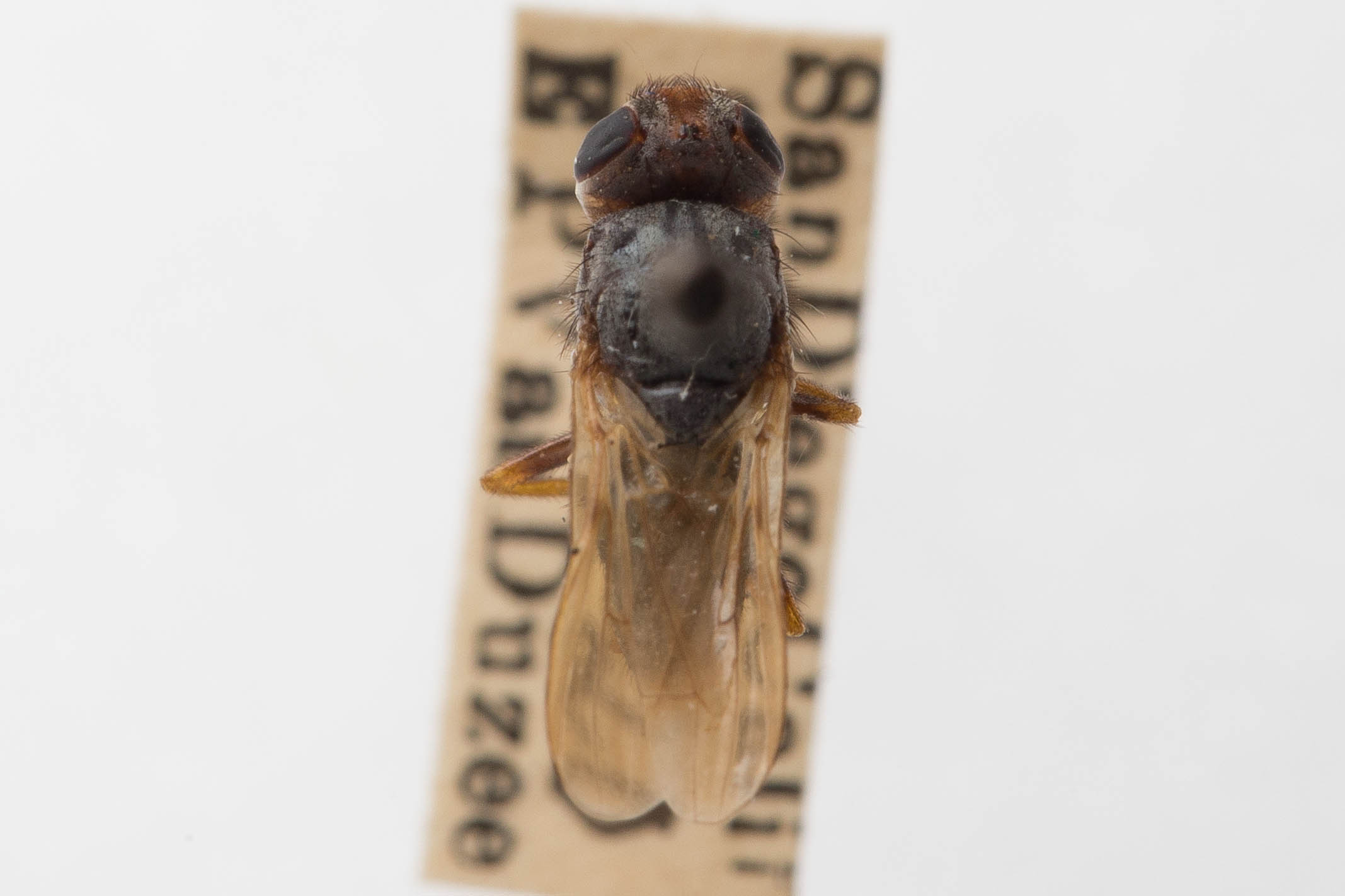
- Tetropismenus hirtus

Scientific classification
- Domain: Eukaryota
- Kingdom: Animalia
- Phylum: Arthropoda
- Class: Insecta
- Order: Diptera
- Family: Ulidiidae
- Tribe: Otitini
- Genus: Tetropismenus

= Tetropismenus =

Genus of flies

Tetropismenus is a genus of picture-winged flies in the family Ulidiidae.

== Species ==
- T. hirtus
