= Pareuxesta =

Scientific classification
- Kingdom: Animalia
- Phylum: Arthropoda
- Class: Insecta
- Order: Diptera
- Family: Ulidiidae
- Subfamily: Ulidiinae
- Tribe: Lipsanini
- Genus: Pareuxesta; Coquillett, 1901

Type species
- Pareuxesta latifasciata Coquillett, 1901

Genus of flies

Pareuxesta is a genus of picture-winged flies in the family Ulidiidae.

== Distribution ==
Species of the genus can be observed in the Dutch Caribbean.

== Species ==
- Pareuxesta academica
- Pareuxesta hyalinata
- Pareuxesta intermedia
- Pareuxesta latifasciata
- Pareuxesta obscura
- Pareuxesta xanthomera
