= Aspistomella =

Scientific classification
- Kingdom: Animalia
- Phylum: Arthropoda
- Clade: Pancrustacea
- Class: Insecta
- Order: Diptera
- Family: Ulidiidae
- Subfamily: Ulidiinae
- Tribe: Lipsanini
- Genus: Aspistomella; Hendel, 1909

Synonyms
- Paraphyola Hendel, 1909

Genus of flies

Aspistomella is a genus of picture-winged flies in the family Ulidiidae.

== Species ==
- Aspistomella angustifrons (Hendel, 1909)
- Aspistomella crucifera (Hendel, 1909)
- Aspistomella duo Kovac, Kameneva & Korneyev, 2024
- Aspistomella enderleini Kovac, Kameneva & Korneyev, 2024
- Aspistomella garlappi Kovac, Kameneva & Korneyev, 2024
- Aspistomella heteroptera Hendel, 1909
- Aspistomella lobioptera Hendel, 1909
- Aspistomella lunata (Hendel, 1909)
- Aspistomella obliqua Kameneva, Korneyev & Savaris, 2024
- Aspistomella pachitea Kameneva & Korneyev, 2024
- Aspistomella quinquincisa Kameneva & Korneyev, 2024
- Aspistomella sachavaca Smit & Kameneva, 2024
- Aspistomella schnusei Kameneva & Korneyev, 2024
- Aspistomella steyskali Kameneva & Korneyev, 2024
- Aspistomella teresensis Araújo, Korneyev & Savaris, 2024
- Aspistomella tres Kovac, Kameneva & Korneyev, 2024
