= Euxestina =

Scientific classification
- Kingdom: Animalia
- Phylum: Arthropoda
- Class: Insecta
- Order: Diptera
- Family: Ulidiidae
- Genus: Euxestina; Macquart, 1835

Species
- Euxestina similis

Genus of flies

Euxestina is a genus of picture-winged flies in the family Ulidiidae.
