= Prionella =

Scientific classification
- Kingdom: Animalia
- Phylum: Arthropoda
- Class: Insecta
- Order: Diptera
- Family: Ulidiidae
- Genus: Prionella; Robineau-Desvoidy, 1830

Genus of flies

Prionella is a genus of picture-winged flies in the family Ulidiidae.

== Species ==
- Prionella beauvoisii
- Prionella villosa
