= Steneretma =

Scientific classification
- Kingdom: Animalia
- Phylum: Arthropoda
- Clade: Pancrustacea
- Class: Insecta
- Order: Diptera
- Family: Ulidiidae
- Subfamily: Ulidiinae
- Genus: Steneretma; Loew, 1873

Synonyms
- Physiphora laticauda

Genus of flies

Steneretma is a genus of picture-winged flies in the family Ulidiidae.

== Species ==
- Steneretma laticauda, formerly Physiphora laticauda
