= Terpnomyia =

Scientific classification
- Kingdom: Animalia
- Phylum: Arthropoda
- Class: Insecta
- Order: Diptera
- Family: Ulidiidae
- Subfamily: Ulidiinae
- Tribe: Pterocallini
- Genus: Terpnomyia; Hendel, 1909

Genus of flies

Terpnomyia is a genus of picture-winged flies in the family Ulidiidae.

== Species ==
- Terpnomyia angustifrons
- Terpnomyia bicolor
- Terpnomyia citrivitta
- Terpnomyia costalis
- Terpnomyia latifrons
- Terpnomyia nitens
- Terpnomyia subandina
- Terpnomyia tigrina
