= Stenomyia laticauda =

Scientific classification
- Kingdom: Animalia
- Phylum: Arthropoda
- Clade: Pancrustacea
- Class: Insecta
- Order: Diptera
- Family: Ulidiidae
- Genus: Chaetopsis
- Species: C. laticauda

Binomial name
- Chaetopsis laticauda Hendel, 1909

Species of fly

Chaetopsis laticauda is a species of ulidiid or picture-winged fly in the genus Chaetopsis of the family Ulidiidae.
