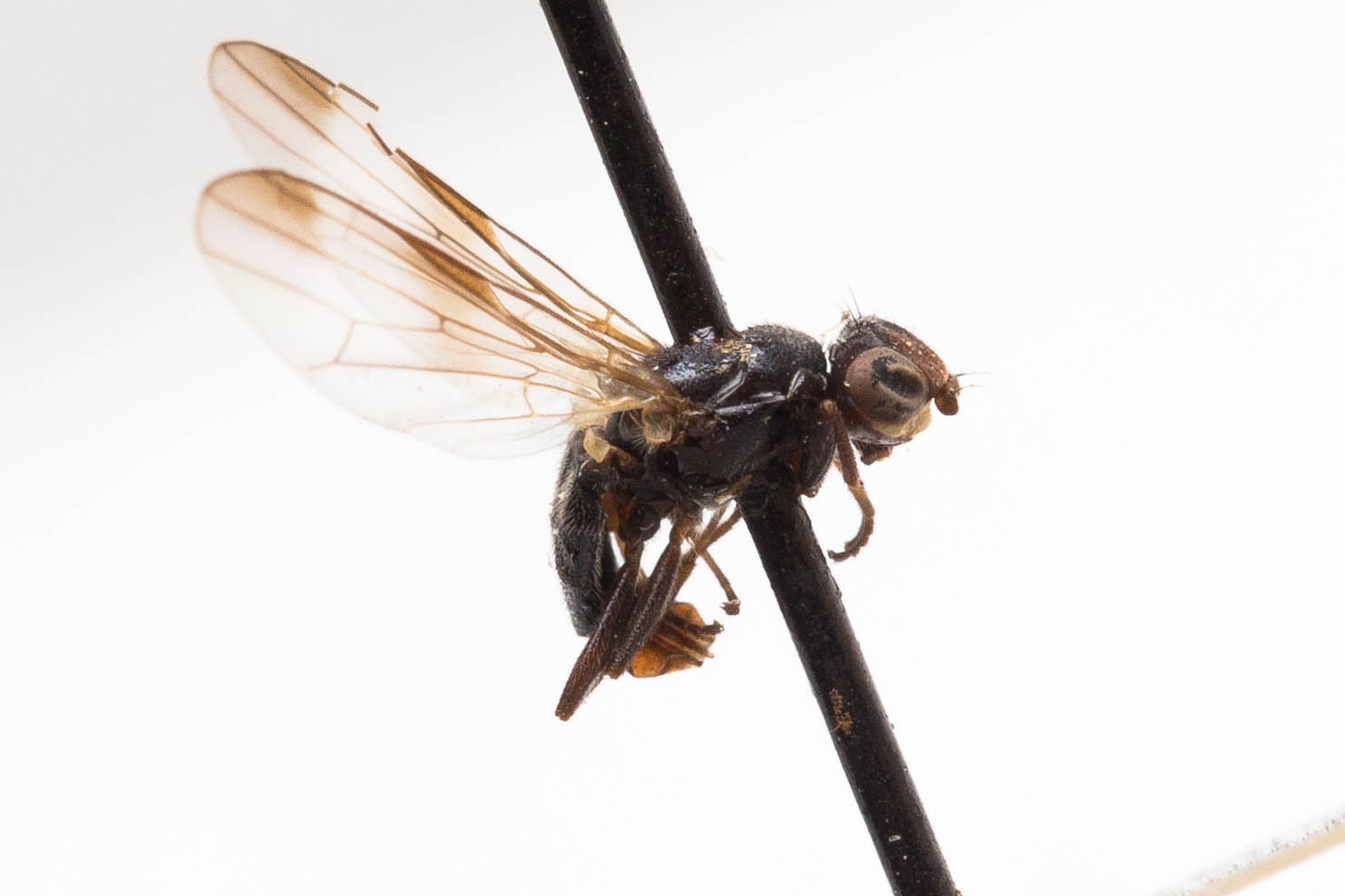
- Homalocephala albitarsis

Scientific classification
- Kingdom: Animalia
- Phylum: Arthropoda
- Clade: Pancrustacea
- Class: Insecta
- Order: Diptera
- Family: Ulidiidae
- Subfamily: Ulidiinae
- Tribe: Seiopterini
- Genus: Homalocephala; Zetterstedt, 1838

Synonyms
- Psairoptera Wahlberg, 1839

= Homalocephala =

Genus of flies

Homalocephala is a genus of picture-winged flies in the family Ulidiidae.

== Species ==
- Homalocephala albitarsis (syn. H. biumbrata)
- Homalocephala angustata
- Homalocephala apicalis (syn. H. similis)
- Homalocephala bimaculata
- Homalocephala bipunctata (Loew, 1854)
- Homalocephala biseta (Frey, 1908)
- Homalocephala mamaevi
- Homalocephala ozerovi
- Homalocephala similis (Cresson, 1924)
