= Megalaemyia =

Scientific classification
- Kingdom: Animalia
- Phylum: Arthropoda
- Clade: Pancrustacea
- Class: Insecta
- Order: Diptera
- Family: Ulidiidae
- Subfamily: Ulidiinae
- Tribe: Pterocallini
- Genus: Megalaemyia; Hendel, 1909

Synonyms
- Megaloprepemyia Hendel, 1909

Genus of flies

Megalaemyia is a genus of picture-winged flies in the family Ulidiidae. There are about 18 species, but only a few are well-described.

== Species ==
- Megalaemyia albostriata Hendel, 1909
- Megalaemyia costalis Hendel, 1909
- Megalaemyia elsae Hendel, 1909
- Megalaemyia excellens (Hendel, 1914)
- Megalaemyia punctulata Hendel, 1909
- Megalaemyia radiata Hendel, 1909
