= Cyrtomostoma =

Scientific classification
- Kingdom: Animalia
- Phylum: Arthropoda
- Clade: Pancrustacea
- Class: Insecta
- Order: Diptera
- Family: Ulidiidae
- Subfamily: Ulidiinae
- Genus: Cyrtomostoma; Hendel, 1909

Genus of flies

Cyrtomostoma is a monotypic genus of picture-winged flies in the family Ulidiidae. The only species is Cyrtomostoma gigas, both described by Friedrich Georg Hendel in 1909.
