= Pseudoseioptera =

Scientific classification
- Kingdom: Animalia
- Phylum: Arthropoda
- Class: Insecta
- Order: Diptera
- Family: Ulidiidae
- Subfamily: Ulidiinae
- Tribe: Seiopterini
- Genus: Pseudoseioptera; Stackelberg 1955

Genus of flies

Pseudoseioptera is a genus of picture-winged flies in the family Ulidiidae.

== Species ==
- Pseudoseioptera albipes
- Pseudoseioptera colon
- Pseudoseioptera dubiosa
- Pseudoseioptera ingrica
