= Notogramma =

Scientific classification
- Kingdom: Animalia
- Phylum: Arthropoda
- Class: Insecta
- Order: Diptera
- Family: Ulidiidae
- Subfamily: Ulidiinae
- Tribe: Lipsanini
- Genus: Notogramma; Loew, 1867

Genus of flies

Notogramma is a genus of picture-winged flies in the family Ulidiidae.

== Species ==
- Notogramma azapae
- Notogramma cactipeodes
- Notogramma cimiciforme
- Notogramma cimiciformis
- Notogramma purpuratum
