= Texasa =

Scientific classification
- Kingdom: Animalia
- Phylum: Arthropoda
- Clade: Pancrustacea
- Class: Insecta
- Order: Diptera
- Family: Ulidiidae
- Tribe: Lipsanini
- Genus: Texasa; Steyskal, 1961

Genus of flies

Texasa is a genus of picture-winged flies in the family Ulidiidae.

== Species ==
- T. chaetifrons
