= Tetrapleura (fly) =

Scientific classification
- Domain: Eukaryota
- Kingdom: Animalia
- Phylum: Arthropoda
- Class: Insecta
- Order: Diptera
- Family: Ulidiidae
- Subfamily: Ulidiinae
- Tribe: Pterocallini
- Genus: Tetrapleura; Schiner, 1868

Genus of flies

Tetrapleura is a genus of picture-winged flies in the family Ulidiidae.

== Species ==
- Tetrapleura limbatofasciata
- Tetrapleura picta
