= Goniaeola =

Scientific classification
- Kingdom: Animalia
- Phylum: Arthropoda
- Class: Insecta
- Order: Diptera
- Family: Ulidiidae
- Genus: Goniaeola; Hendel, 1909

Synonyms
- Goniaea Hendel, 1909; Not Goniaea Carl Stål, 1873

Genus of flies

Goniaeola is a genus of picture-winged flies in the family Ulidiidae.

== Species ==
- Goniaeola foveolata Hendel 1909
