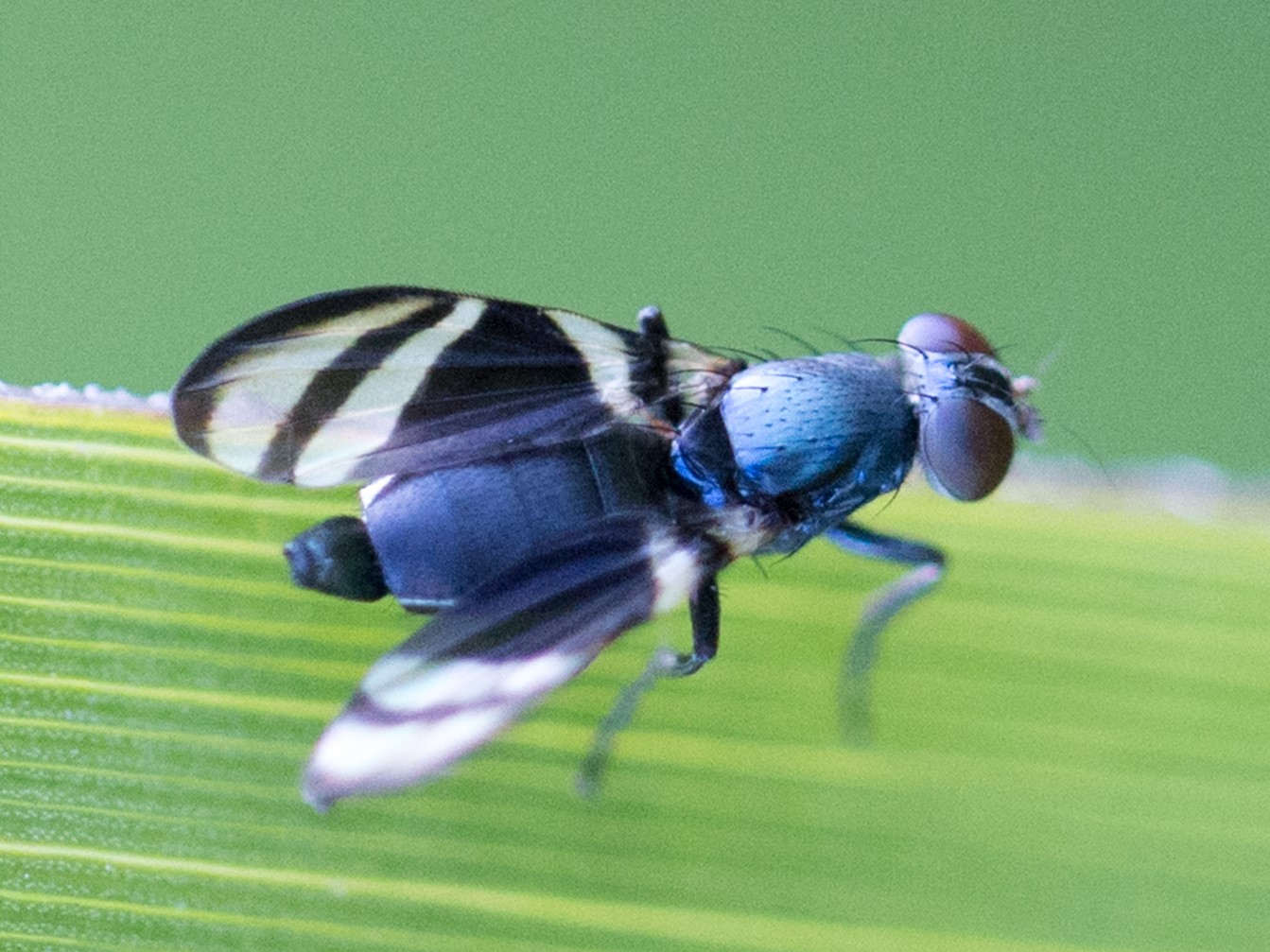

Scientific classification
- Kingdom: Animalia
- Phylum: Arthropoda
- Clade: Pancrustacea
- Class: Insecta
- Order: Diptera
- Family: Ulidiidae
- Genus: Polyteloptera; Hendel, 1909
- Species: P. apotropa

Binomial name
- Polyteloptera apotropa Hendel, 1909

= Polyteloptera =

Genus of flies

Polyteloptera is a genus of picture-winged flies in the family Ulidiidae. It is monotypic, being represented by the single species Polyteloptera apotropa.
