= Axiologina =

Scientific classification
- Kingdom: Animalia
- Phylum: Arthropoda
- Clade: Pancrustacea
- Class: Insecta
- Order: Diptera
- Family: Ulidiidae
- Tribe: Lipsanini
- Genus: Axiologina; Hendel, 1909

Genus of flies

Axiologina is a genus of picture-winged flies in the family Ulidiidae.

== Species ==
- Axiologina aitkeni Steyskal, 1973
- Axiologina ferrumequinum Hendel, 1909
