= Acrostictomyia =

Scientific classification
- Kingdom: Animalia
- Phylum: Arthropoda
- Clade: Pancrustacea
- Class: Insecta
- Order: Diptera
- Family: Ulidiidae
- Tribe: Lipsanini
- Genus: Acrostictomyia; Blanchard, 1938

Genus of flies

Acrostictomyia is a genus of picture-winged fly in the family Ulidiidae.

== Species ==
- Acrostictomyia longistigma
- Acrostictomyia subapicalis
