= Neoeuxesta =

Scientific classification
- Domain: Eukaryota
- Kingdom: Animalia
- Phylum: Arthropoda
- Class: Insecta
- Order: Diptera
- Family: Ulidiidae
- Tribe: Lipsanini
- Genus: Neoeuxesta; Malloch, 1930

Type species
- Neoeuxesta fumicosta Malloch, 1930

Species
- N. fumicosta Malloch, 1930; N. guamana Steyskal, 1952

Genus of flies

Neoeuxesta is a genus of picture-winged flies in the family Ulidiidae. As of 2012, it consists of the following species:

- N. fumicosta Malloch, 1930 — Samoa
- N. guamana Steyskal, 1952 — Guam
