= Cenchrometopa =

Scientific classification
- Kingdom: Animalia
- Phylum: Arthropoda
- Clade: Pancrustacea
- Class: Insecta
- Order: Diptera
- Family: Ulidiidae
- Genus: Cenchrometopa; Hendel, 1909
- Species: C. curvinervis

Binomial name
- Cenchrometopa curvinervis Hendel, 1909

Genus of flies

Cenchrometopa curvinervis is the only species in the genus Cenchrometopa of the family Ulidiidae (ulidiid or picture-winged flies).
