= Ulivellia =

Scientific classification
- Kingdom: Animalia
- Phylum: Arthropoda
- Class: Insecta
- Order: Diptera
- Family: Ulidiidae
- Genus: Ulivellia

Genus of flies

Ulivellia is a genus of picture-winged flies in the family Ulidiidae.

== Species ==
- U. inversa
- Ulivellia Speiser
