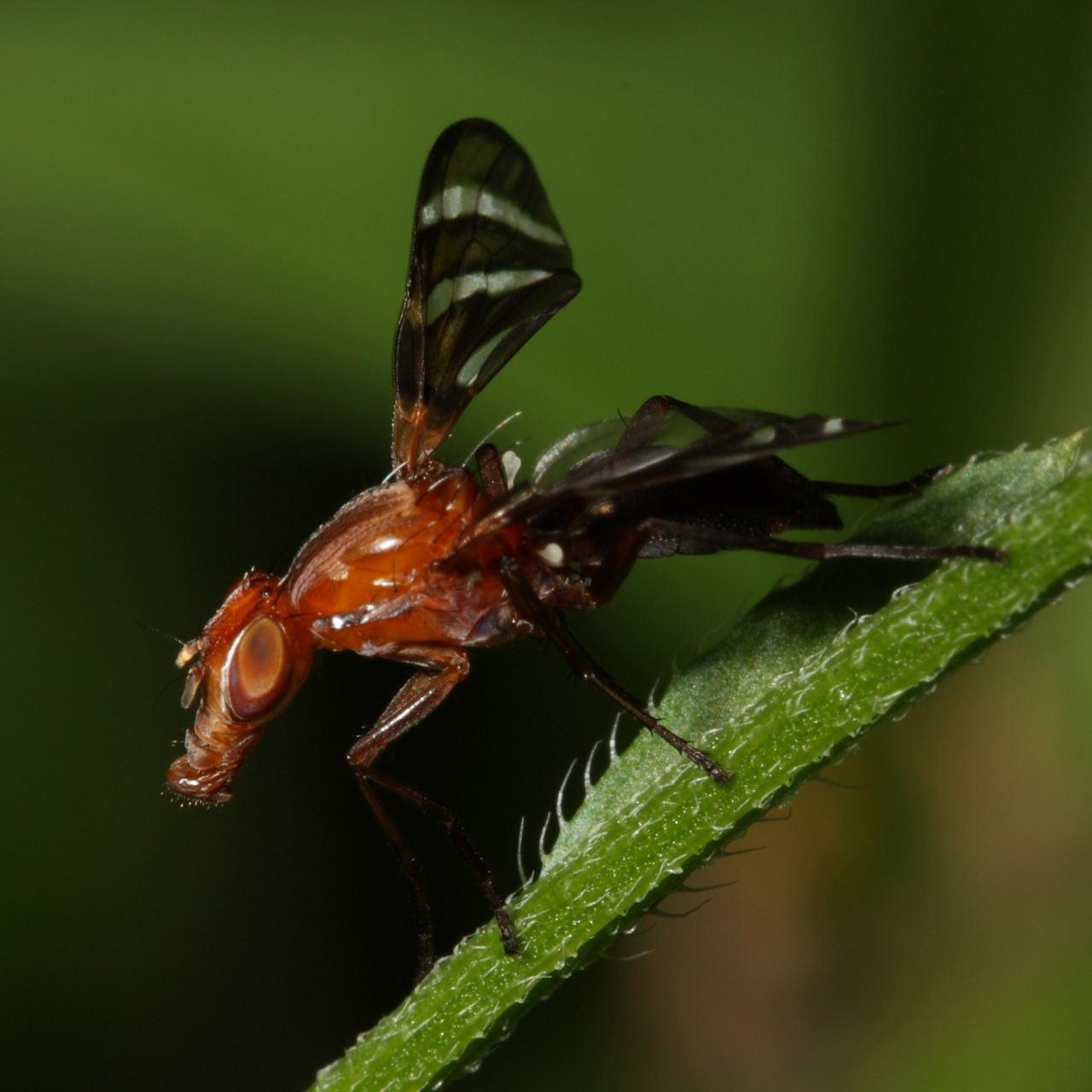
- Tritoxa incurva

Scientific classification
- Kingdom: Animalia
- Phylum: Arthropoda
- Class: Insecta
- Order: Diptera
- Superfamily: Tephritoidea
- Family: Ulidiidae; Macquart, 1835

Subfamilies
- Otitinae Aldrich, 1932; Ulidiinae Macquart, 1835

Synonyms
- Ortalidae; Otitidae

= Ulidiidae =

Family of flies

The Ulidiidae (formerly Otitidae) or picture-winged flies are a large and diverse cosmopolitan family of flies (Diptera), and as in related families, most species are herbivorous or detritivorous. They are often known as picture-winged flies, along with members of other families in the superfamily Tephritoidea that have patterns of bands or spots on the wings. Some species share with the Tephritidae an unusual elongated posteroapical projection of the anal cell in the wing, but can be differentiated by the smoothly curving subcostal vein. Two species, Tetanops myopaeformis and Euxesta stigmatias, are agricultural pests.

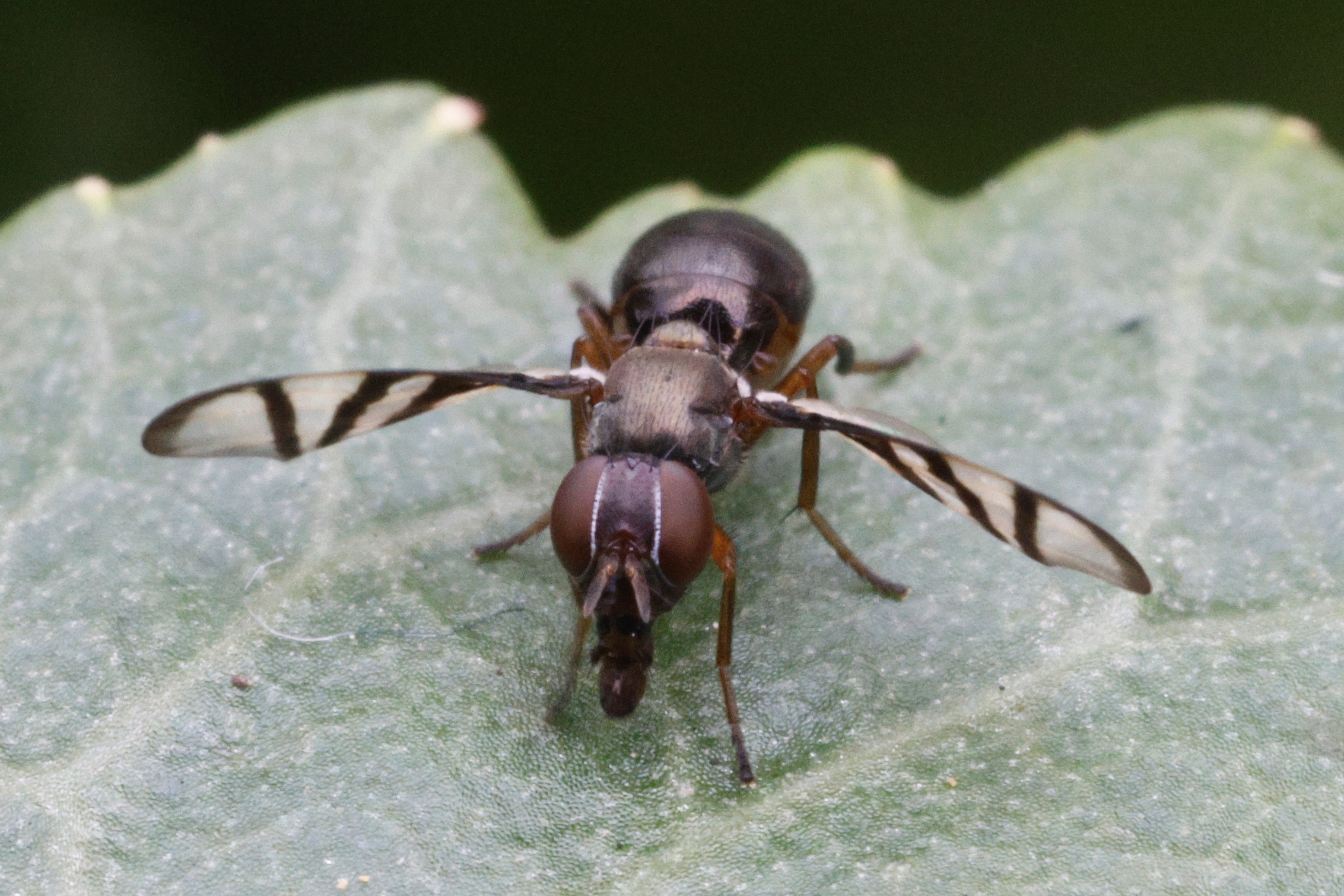
Picture Winged fly, Ulidiidae

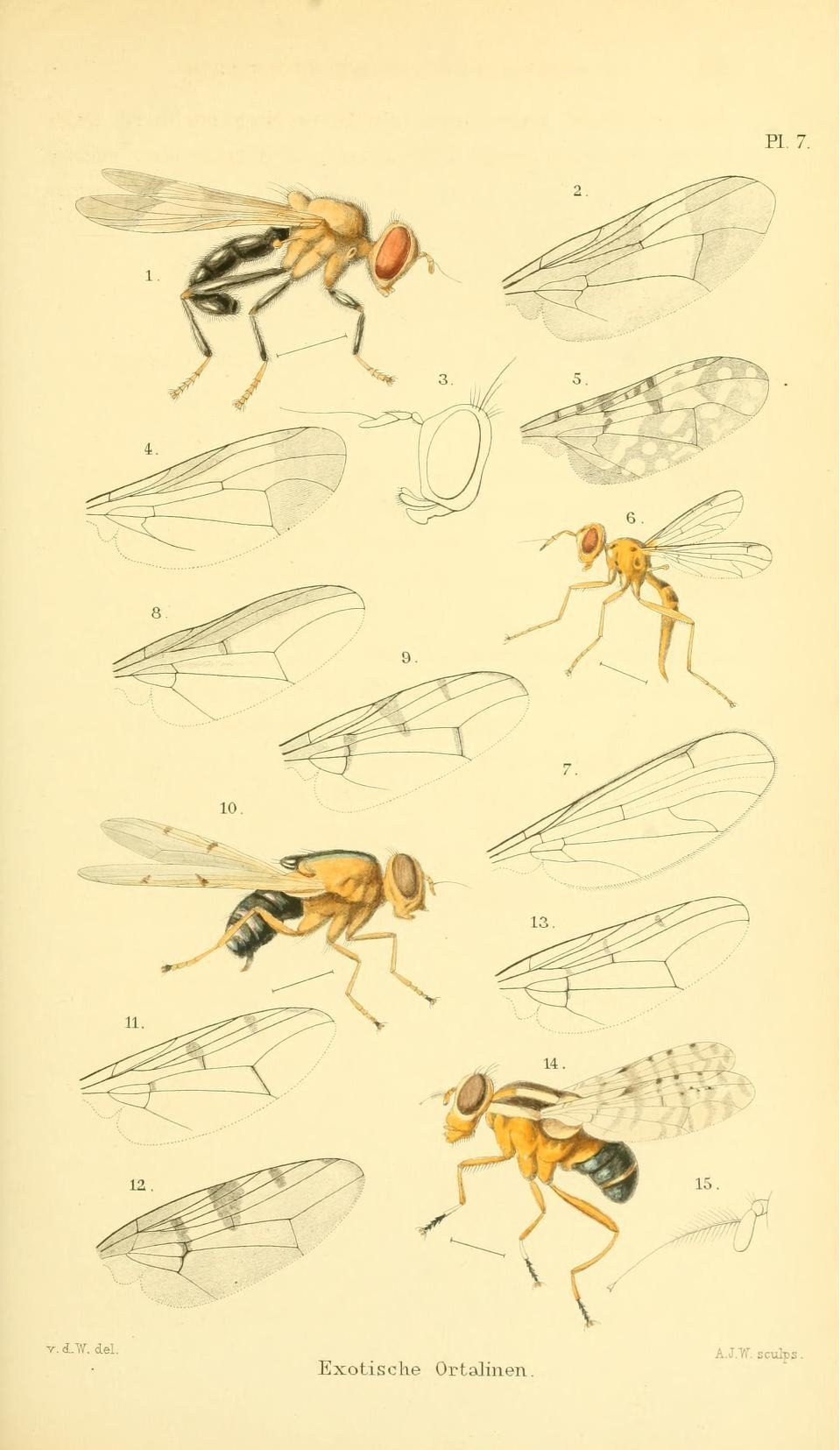
Tropical Ulidiidae

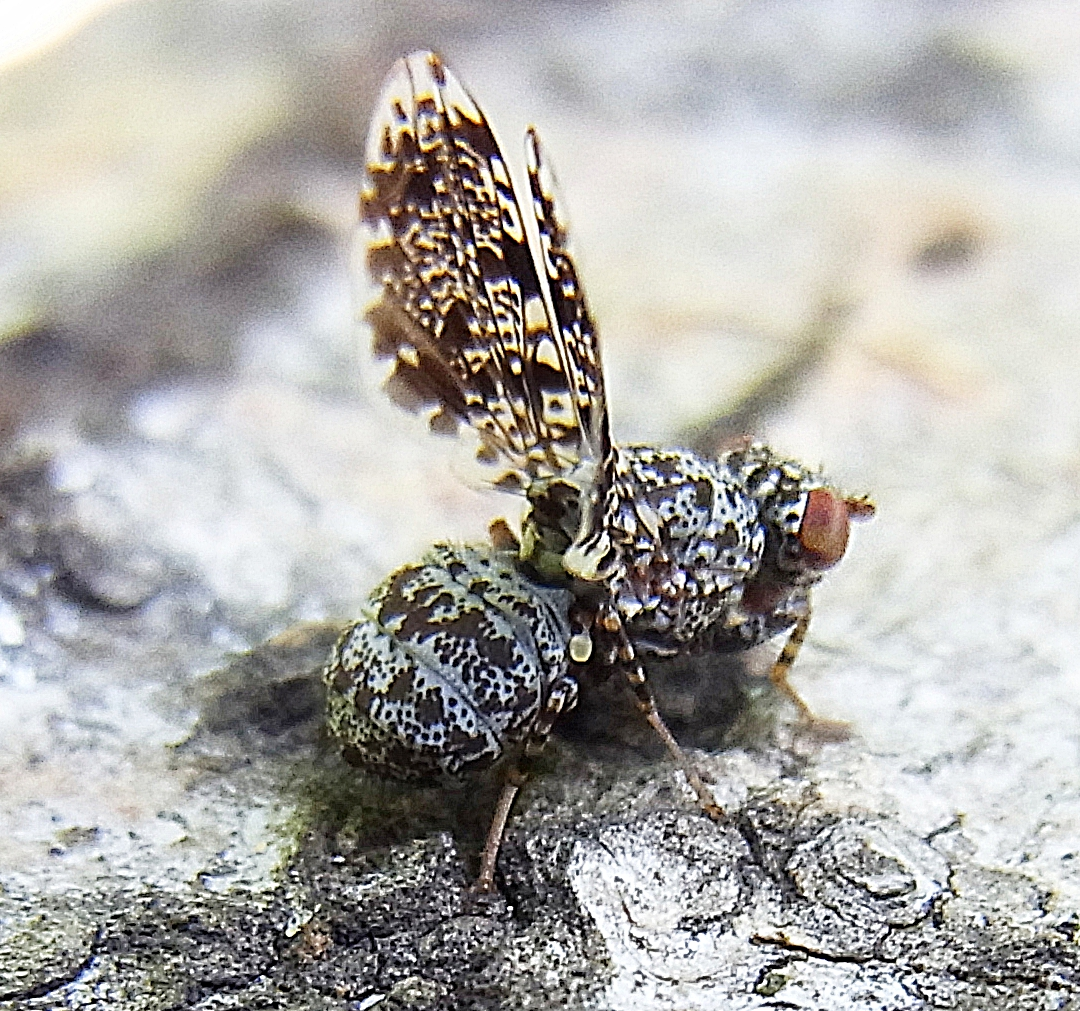
Callopistromyia annulipes

== Systematics ==
The Ulidiidae are divided into two subfamilies.

=== Subfamily Otitinae ===
Tribe Cephaliini Schiner, 1864
- Acrostictella Hendel, 1914
- Cephalia Meigen, 1826
- Delphinia Robineau-Desvoidy, 1830
- Myiomyrmica Steyskal, 1961
- Myrmecothea Hendel, 1910
- Proteseia Korneyev & Hernandes, 1998
- Pterotaenia Rondani, 1868
- Tritoxa Loew, 1873
Tribe Myennidini Kameneva & Korneyev, 2006
- Acatochaeta Enderlein, 1921
- Arborotites Barraclough, 2000
- Callopistromyia Hendel, 1907
- Dyscrasis Aldrich, 1932
- Myennis Robineau-Desvoidy, 1830
- Namibotites Barraclough, 2000
- Neodyscrasis Kameneva & Korneyev, 2006
- Oedopa Loew, 1868
- Paroedopa Coquillett, 1900
- Pseudodyscrasis Hernández-Ortiz, 1988
- Pseudotephritina Malloch, 1931
- Pseudotephritis Johnson, 1902
- Stictoedopa Brèthes, 1926
- Stictomyia Bigot, 1885
- Ulidiotites Steyskal, 1961
Tribe Otitini Aldrich, 1932
- Ceroxys Macquart, 1835
- Dorycera Meigen, 1830
- Herina Robineau-Desvoidy, 1830
- Hiatus Cresson, 1906
- Melieria Robineau-Desvoidy, 1830
- Otites Latreille, 1804
- Tetanops Fallén, 1820
- Ulidiopsis Hennig, 1941
Otitinae incertae sedis
- Curranops Harriot, 1942
- Diacrita Gerstäcker, 1860
- Haigia Steyskal, 1961
- Idana Loew, 1873
- Psaeropterella Hendel, 1914
- Pseudomelieria Brèthes, 1921
- Tetropismenus Loew, 1876
- Tujunga Steyskal, 1961

=== Subfamily Ulidiinae ===
Tribe Lipsanini Enderlin, 1838
- Acrosticta Loew, 1868
- Acrostictomyia Blanchard, 1938
- Aspistomella Hendel, 1909
- Axiologina Hendel, 1909
- Cenchrometopa Hendel, 1909
- Chaetopsis Loew, 1868
- Euacaina Steyskal, 1963
- Eumecosomyia Hendel, 1909
- Eumetopiella Hendel, 1907
- Euphara Loew, 1868
- Euxesta Loew, 1868
- Heterodoxa J. R. Malloch, 1832
- Hypoecta Loew, 1868
- Lipsana Enderlein, 1938
- Neoeuxesta Malloch, 1930
- Notogramma Loew, 1868
- Paraphyola Hendel, 1909
- Pareuxesta Coquillett, 1901
- Perissoneura J. R. Malloch, 1832
- Polyteloptera Hendel, 1909
- Pseudeuxesta Hendel, 1910
- Siopa Hendel, 1909
- Steneretma
- Stenomyia Loew, 1868
- Texasa
- Ulivellia Speiser, 1929
- Vladolinia Kameneva, 2005
- Zacompsia Coquillett, 1901
Tribe Pterocallini Loew, 1868
- Aciuroides Hendel, 1914
- Apterocerina Hendel, 1909
- Chondrometopum Hendel, 1909
- Coscinum Hendel, 1909
- Cymatozus Enderlein, 1912
- Cyrtomostoma Hendel, 1909
- Dasymetopa Loew, 1868
- Elapata Hendel, 1909
- Goniaeola Hendel, 1909
- Lathrostigma Enderlein
- Megalaemyia Hendel, 1909
- Micropterocerus Hendel, 1914
- Neomyennis Hendel, 1914
- Ophthalmoptera Hendel, 1909
- Paragoniaeola?
- Paragorgopis Giglio-Tos, 1893
- Parophthalmoptera?
- Perissoza?
- Plagiocephalus Wiedemann, 1830
- Pterocalla Rondani, 1848
- Pterocerina Hendel, 1909
- Rhyparella Hendel, 1909
- Sympaectria Hendel, 1909
- Terpnomyennis Kameneva, 2004
- Terpnomyia Hendel, 1909
- Tetrapleura Schiner, 1868
- Xanthacrona Wulp, 1899
Tribe Seiopterini Kameneva and Korneyev, 1994
- Homalocephala Zetterstedt, 1838

Syn.: Psairoptera

- Pseudoseioptera Stackelberg 1955
- Seioptera Kirby, 1817

Syn.: Ortalis Fallén, 1810

Tribe Ulidiini Macquart, 1835
- Physiphora Fallén, 1810
- Timia Wiedemann, 1824
- Ulidia Meigen, 1826

=== Others ===
- Anacampta
- Blainvillia
- Califortalis
- Carlottaemyia
- Eupterocerina
- Euxestina
- Heramyia
- Hypochra
- Idanophana
- Macheirocera
- Meckelia
- Megaloprepemyia
- Metopocampta
- Myrmecomyia
- Ophryoterpnomyia
- Ortalis
- Paragorgopsis
- Phaeosoma
- Platyeuxesta
- Prionella
- Rhadinomyia
- Schnusimyia
- Systata
- Tephronota
- Terelliosoma
- Vespomima
