= Ortalis (fly) =

Scientific classification
- Kingdom: Animalia
- Phylum: Arthropoda
- Clade: Pancrustacea
- Class: Insecta
- Order: Diptera
- Family: Ulidiidae
- Subfamily: Ulidiinae
- Genus: Ortalis; Fallén, 1810

Genus of flies

Ortalis is an historic genus of Ulidiid or picture-winged flies, first described by Fallén in 1810. It served as the type genus for the family Ulidiidae, which was called Ortalidae at the time. In 1932, it was pointed out by Adlrich that the name Ortalis was preoccupied by a genus of birds (in family Cracidae) which had been named by Merrem in 1786. The name of the fly family was therefore revised, with some authors calling it Otitidae until Ulidiidae was settled on as standard. The genus itself was found to be paraphyletic, and all of its species have been reassigned to other genera, some in the Ulidiidae, and some in other Tephritoid families. In the following list, the species are organized according to the families and genera to which they have been reassigned.

== Family Ulidiidae ==
Ceroxys

- Ortalis cinifera (Loew, 1846) → Ceroxys cinifera
- Ortalis confusa (Becker, 1912) → Ceroxys confusa
- Ortalis fraudulosa (Loew, 1864) → Ceroxys fraudulosa
- Ortalis laticornis → Ceroxys laticornis

Chaetopsis

- Ortalis aenea (Wiedemann, 1830) → Chaetopsis aenea
  - Ortalis trifasciata (Wiedemann, 1830) → Chaetopsis aenea
- Ortalis massyla (Walker, 1849) → Chaetopsis massyla

Eumecosomyia

- Ortalis nubila (Wiedemann, 1830) → Eumecosomyia nubila

Euxesta

- Ortalis basalis (Walker, 1852) → Euxesta basalis
- Ortalis leucomelas (Walker, 1860) → Euxesta leucomelas
- Ortalis notata (Wiedemann, 1830) → Euxesta notata
- Ortalis platystoma (Thomson, 1869) → Euxesta spoliata
- Ortalis sororcula Wiedemann, 1830 → Euxesta sororcula

Herina

- Ortalis lacustris (Meigen, 1826) → Herina lacustris
- Ortalis lugubris (Meigen, 1826) → Herina lugubris
- Ortalis palustris (Meigen, 1826) → Herina palustris
- Ortalis parva (Loew, 1864) → Herina parva
- Ortalis tristis (Meigen, 1826) → Herina tristis
  - Ortalis bifasciata Loew, 1858 → Herina tristis
  - Ortalis gyrans Loew, 1864 → Herina tristis

Hypochra

- Ortalis albipennis (Loew, 1846) → Hypochra albipennis

Idana

- Ortalis marginata (Say, 1830) → Idana marginata

Melieria

- Ortalis acuticornis (Loew, 1854) → Melieria acuticornis
- Ortalis cana (Loew, 1858) → Melieria cana
- Ortalis omissa (Meigen, 1826) → Melieria omissa
- Ortalis unicolor (Loew, 1854) → Melieria unicolor

Otites

- Ortalis angustata (Loew, 1859) → Otites angustata
- Ortalis bimaculata (Hendel, 1911) → Otites bimaculata
- Ortalis dominula (Loew, 1868) → Otites dominula
- Ortalis erythrocephala (Hendel, 1911) → Otites erythrocephala
- Ortalis grata (Loew, 1856) → Otites grata
- Ortalis nebulosa (Meigen, 1830) → Otites nebulosa
- Ortalis snowi (Cresson, 1924) → Otites snowi
- Ortalis stigma (Hendel, 1911) → Otites stigma

Pseudotephritis

- Ortalis vau (Say, 1829) → Pseudotephritis vau

Pterotaenia

- Ortalis fasciata (Wiedemann, 1830) → Pterotaenia fasciata

Seioptera

- Ortalis costalis (Walker, 1849) → Seioptera costalis

== Family Platystomatidae ==
Atopognathus

- Ortalis complens (Walker, 1859) → Atopognathus complens
- Ortalis leucomerus → Atopognathus leucomerus
- Ortalis tarsalis → Atopognathus tarsalis

Cleitamia

- Ortalis astrolabei (Boisduval, 1835) → Cleitamia astrolabei

Engistoneura

- Ortalis parallela → Engistoneura parallela

Euxestomoea

- Ortalis prompta (Walker, 1859) → Euxestomoea prompta

Neoardelio

- Ortalis alternatus → Neoardelio alternatus

Poecilotraphera

- Ortalis comperei (Coquillett) → Poecilotraphera comperei

Pseudepicausta

- Ortalis bigotii (Macquart, 1851) → Pseudepicausta bigotii

Rhytidortalis

- Ortalis conformis (Walker, 1853) → Rhytidortalis conformis (or incertae sedis)

Rivellia

- Ortalis aequifera (Walker, 1862) → Rivellia aequifera
- Ortalis bipars (Walker, 1861) → Rivellia bipars
- Ortalis concisivitta (Walker, 1862) → Rivellia concisivitta
- Ortalis decatomoides (Walker, 1862) → Rivellia decatomoides
- Ortalis isara → Rivellia isara
- Ortalis ligata (Say, 1830) → Rivellia ligata
- Ortalis mentissa (Walker, 1849) → Rivellia mentissa
- Ortalis obliqua (Walker, 1861) → Rivellia obliqua
- Ortalis vacillans (Walker, 1860) → Rivellia vacillans

Traphera

- Ortalis chalybea → Traphera chalybea

Zygaenula

- Ortalis dispila (Thomson, 1869) → Zygaenula dispila (or incertae sedis)

== Family Richardiidae ==
Automola

- Ortalis atomaria → Automola atomaria

== Family Tephritidae ==
Pseudoedaspis

- Ortalis decorata (Blanchard, 1852) → Pseudoedaspis decorata
- Ortalis striolata (Blanchard, 1852) → Pseudoedaspis striolata

== Uncertain ==
- Ortalis fenestrata → ???
- Ortalis flavoscutellata → ???
- Ortalis longicornis → ???
- Ortalis picta → ???
- Ortalis quinquemaculata → ???
- Ortalis semivitta → ???
