= Piara =

Piara may refer to:

== Given name ==
- Piara Singh Bhaniara (1958–2019)
- Piara Singh Gill (1911–2002), Indian nuclear physicist
- Piara Khabra (1921–2007), British politician
- Ram Piara Saraf (1924–2009), Indian politician
- Choudhary Piara Singh, Indian politician

== Other uses ==
- Piara (fly), a genus of fly in subfamily Trapherinae
