= O. fenestrata =

O. fenestrata may refer to:

- Ocenebra fenestrata, the fenestrate oyster drill, a sea snail species in the genus Ocenebra found in South Africa
- Oliva fenestrata, Röding, 1798, a sea snail species in the genus Oliva
- Ortalis fenestrata, a picture-winged fly species

== See also ==
- Fenestrata (disambiguation)
