= C. magna =

C. magna may refer to:

- Cavia magna, the greater guinea pig, a guinea pig species found in Argentina, Brazil and Uruguay
- Chaetopsis magna, a picture-winged fly species

== See also ==
- Magna (disambiguation)
