= Ortalis semivitta =

Scientific classification
- Kingdom: Animalia
- Phylum: Arthropoda
- Clade: Pancrustacea
- Class: Insecta
- Order: Diptera
- Family: Ulidiidae
- Genus: Ortalis
- Species: O. semivitta

Binomial name
- Ortalis semivitta

Species of fly

Ortalis semivitta is a species of ufly in the genus Ortalis of the family Ulidiidae.
