= Neoardelio alternatus =

Scientific classification
- Kingdom: Animalia
- Phylum: Arthropoda
- Clade: Pancrustacea
- Class: Insecta
- Order: Diptera
- Family: Platystomatidae
- Genus: Neoardelio
- Species: N. alternatus

Binomial name
- Neoardelio alternatus (Walker, 1861)

Synonyms
- Ortalis alternatus Walker, 1861; Neoardelio nigricans Hendel, 1914

Species of fly

Neoardelio alternatus is a species of fly in the genus Neoardelio of the family Platystomatidae.
