= Rivellia aequifera =

Scientific classification
- Kingdom: Animalia
- Phylum: Arthropoda
- Clade: Pancrustacea
- Class: Insecta
- Order: Diptera
- Family: Platystomatidae
- Genus: Rivellia
- Species: R. aequifera

Binomial name
- Rivellia aequifera (Walker, 1861)

Synonyms
- Ortalis aequifera Walker, 1861

Species of fly

Rivellia aequifera is a species of fly in the genus Rivellia of the family Platystomatidae.
