= Eumecosomyia hambletoni =

Scientific classification
- Domain: Eukaryota
- Kingdom: Animalia
- Phylum: Arthropoda
- Class: Insecta
- Order: Diptera
- Family: Ulidiidae
- Genus: Eumecosomyia
- Species: E. hambletoni

Binomial name
- Eumecosomyia hambletoni Steyskal, 1966

Species of fly

Eumecosomyia hambletoni is a species of ulidiid or picture-winged fly in the genus Eumecosomyia of the family Ulidiidae. The species' habitat is Guatemala.
