= Chaetopsis praeceps =

Scientific classification
- Kingdom: Animalia
- Phylum: Arthropoda
- Class: Insecta
- Order: Diptera
- Family: Ulidiidae
- Genus: Chaetopsis
- Species: C. praeceps

Binomial name
- Chaetopsis praeceps Hendel, 1909

Species of fly

Chaetopsis praeceps is a species of ulidiid or picture-winged fly in the genus Chaetopsis of the family Tephritidae.
