= Poecilotraphera comperei =

Scientific classification
- Kingdom: Animalia
- Phylum: Arthropoda
- Clade: Pancrustacea
- Class: Insecta
- Order: Diptera
- Family: Platystomatidae
- Genus: Poecilotraphera
- Species: P. comperei

Binomial name
- Poecilotraphera comperei (Coquillett, 1904)

Synonyms
- Ortalis comperei Coquillett, 1904

Species of fly

Ortalis comperei is a species of fly in the genus Poecilotraphera of the family Platystomatidae.
