= Seioptera colon =

Scientific classification
- Kingdom: Animalia
- Phylum: Arthropoda
- Class: Insecta
- Order: Diptera
- Family: Ulidiidae
- Genus: Seioptera
- Species: S. colon

Binomial name
- Seioptera colon Loew, 1868

Species of fly

Seioptera colon is a species of ulidiid or picture-winged fly in the genus Seioptera of the family Ulidiidae.
