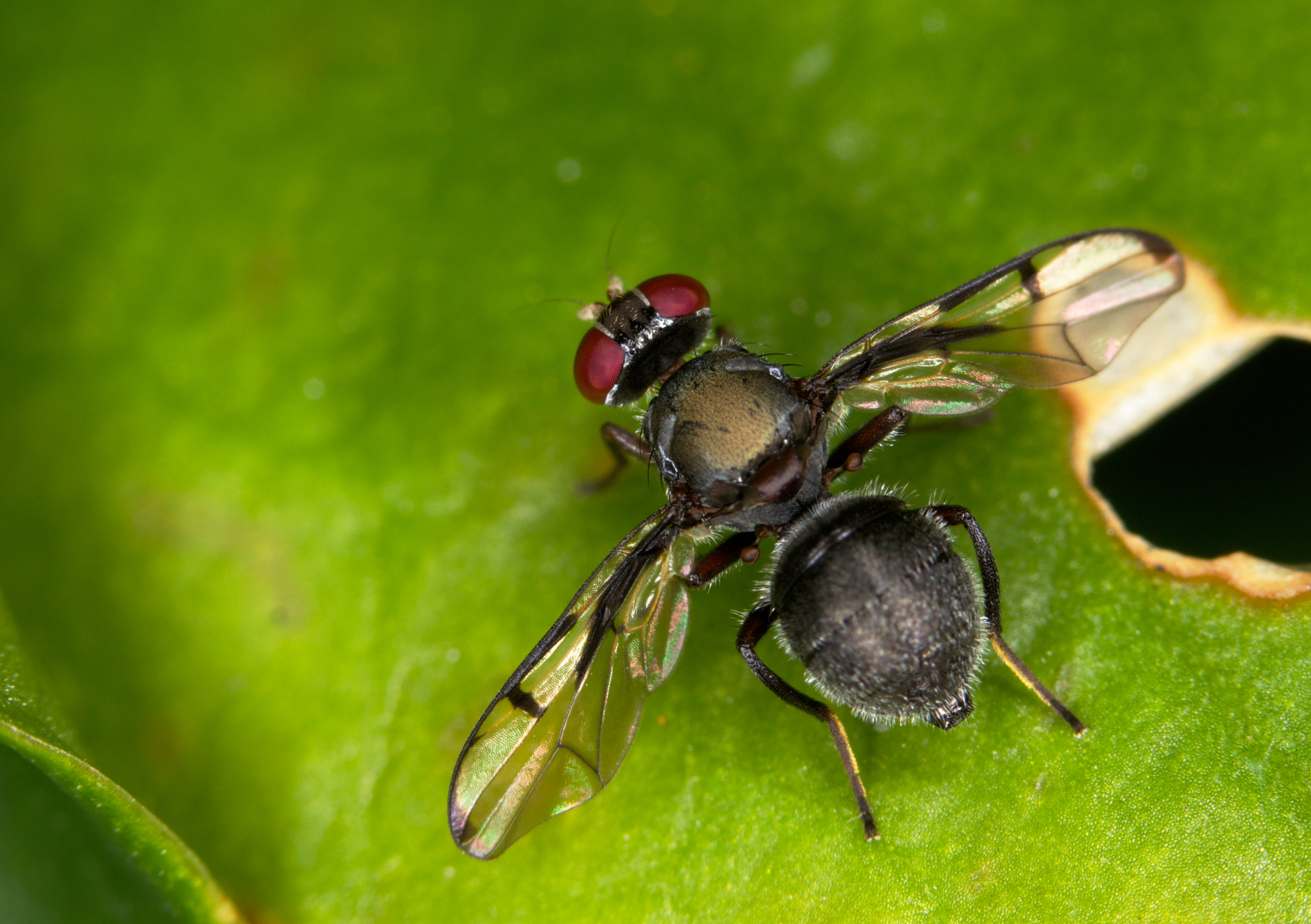

Scientific classification
- Kingdom: Animalia
- Phylum: Arthropoda
- Clade: Pancrustacea
- Class: Insecta
- Order: Diptera
- Family: Platystomatidae
- Genus: Pogonortalis
- Species: P. doclea

Binomial name
- Pogonortalis doclea (Walker, 1849)

Synonyms
- Trypeta doclea Walker, 1849

= Pogonortalis doclea =

Species of fly

Pogonortalis doclea, the boatman fly, is a species of signal fly (family Platystomatidae). It is native to Australia and has been introduced to California in the United States.

== Description ==
Characteristics of P. doclea are: the cheek immediately below the eye being less than a tenth the height of the eye; the hind femur having an anteroventral keel at the distal third; and the anterior crossvein of the wing meeting vein 4 before the mid-length of the discal cell.

P. doclea is sexually dimorphic. Males have a bundle of long curved bristles on each cheek of the head. In this location, females have a single shorter bristle among small hairs. Larger males also have the head ventrally widened.

== Behaviour ==
The waving wing movements for which the fly is named.

This species waves its wings like the rowing of oars on a boat, thus the common name "boatman fly". A slow approach to other flies with the wings held at a depressed slant, extended forwards, indicated cautious investigation.

Pogonortalis doclea is commonly found in Australian gardens. Adults are attracted to and feed on the fresh dung of mammals.

Males are territorial, engaging in face-to-face pushing contests, using the bundle of long, curved bristles on either cheek. In such cases the males often interlock bristles, and push against each other. All tarsi maintain contact with the substrate, and the contest continues until one fly is pushed backwards, and flies away.

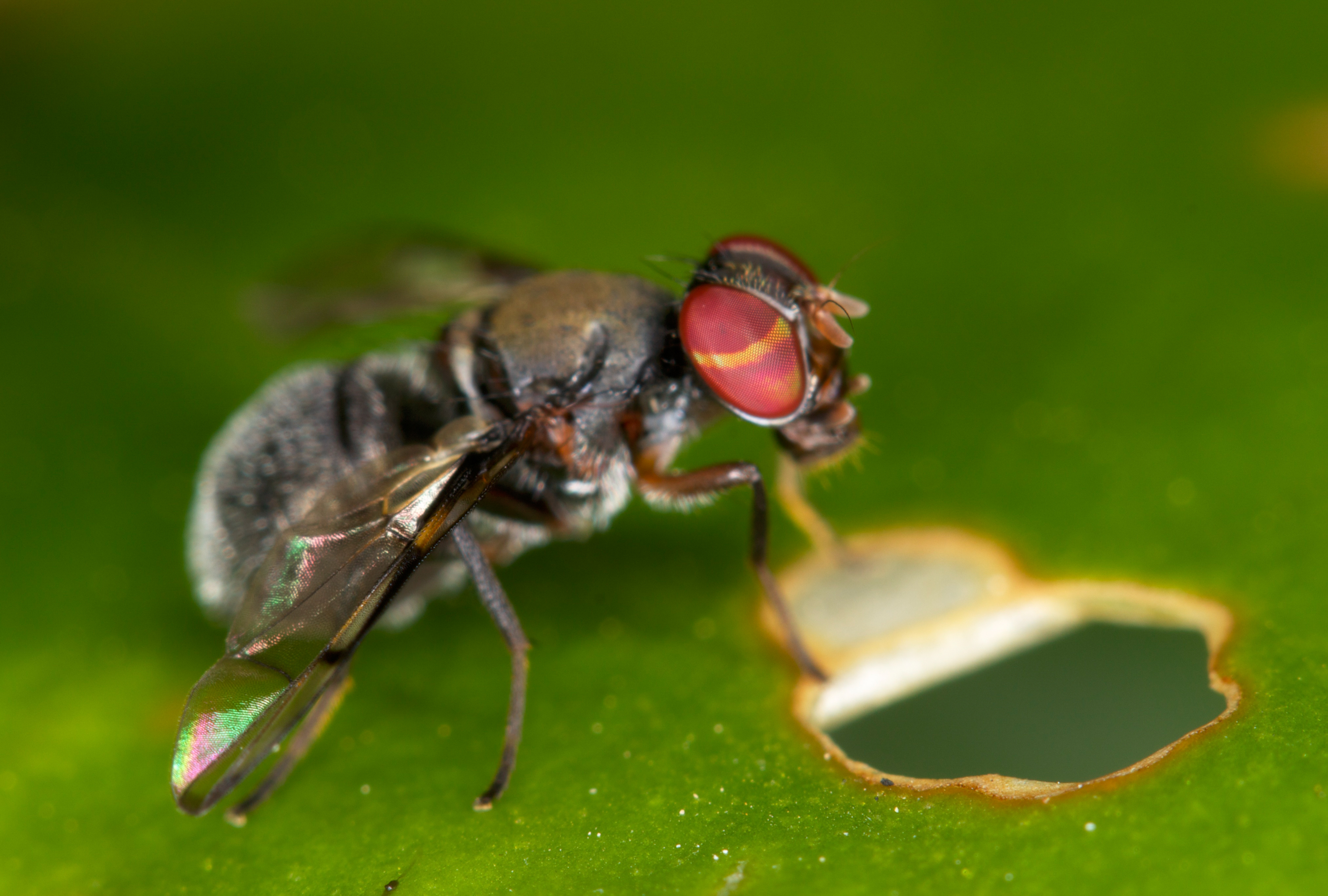
Boatman fly, Pogonortalis doclea
