= Atopognathus complens =

Scientific classification
- Kingdom: Animalia
- Phylum: Arthropoda
- Clade: Pancrustacea
- Class: Insecta
- Order: Diptera
- Family: Platystomatidae
- Genus: Atopognathus
- Species: A. complens

Binomial name
- Atopognathus complens (Walker, 1859)

Synonyms
- Ortalis complens Walker, 1850; Ortalis contigua Walker, 1865

Species of fly

Atopognathus complens is a species of fly in the genus Atopognathus of the family Platystomatidae.
