= Automola rufa =

Scientific classification
- Domain: Eukaryota
- Kingdom: Animalia
- Phylum: Arthropoda
- Class: Insecta
- Order: Diptera
- Family: Richardiidae
- Genus: Automola
- Species: A. rufa

Binomial name
- Automola rufa Cresson, 1906

Synonyms
- Epiplatea dohaniani Johnson, 1921

Species of fly

Automola rufa is a species of fly in the family Richardiidae.
