= Pseudoedaspis biseta =

Scientific classification
- Kingdom: Animalia
- Phylum: Arthropoda
- Class: Insecta
- Order: Diptera
- Family: Tephritidae
- Subfamily: Tephritinae
- Tribe: Tephritini
- Genus: Pseudoedaspis
- Species: P. biseta

Binomial name
- Pseudoedaspis biseta Hendel, 1914

Species of fly

Pseudoedaspis biseta is a species of tephritid or fruit flies in the genus Pseudoedaspis of the family Tephritidae.

== Distribution ==
Argentina.
