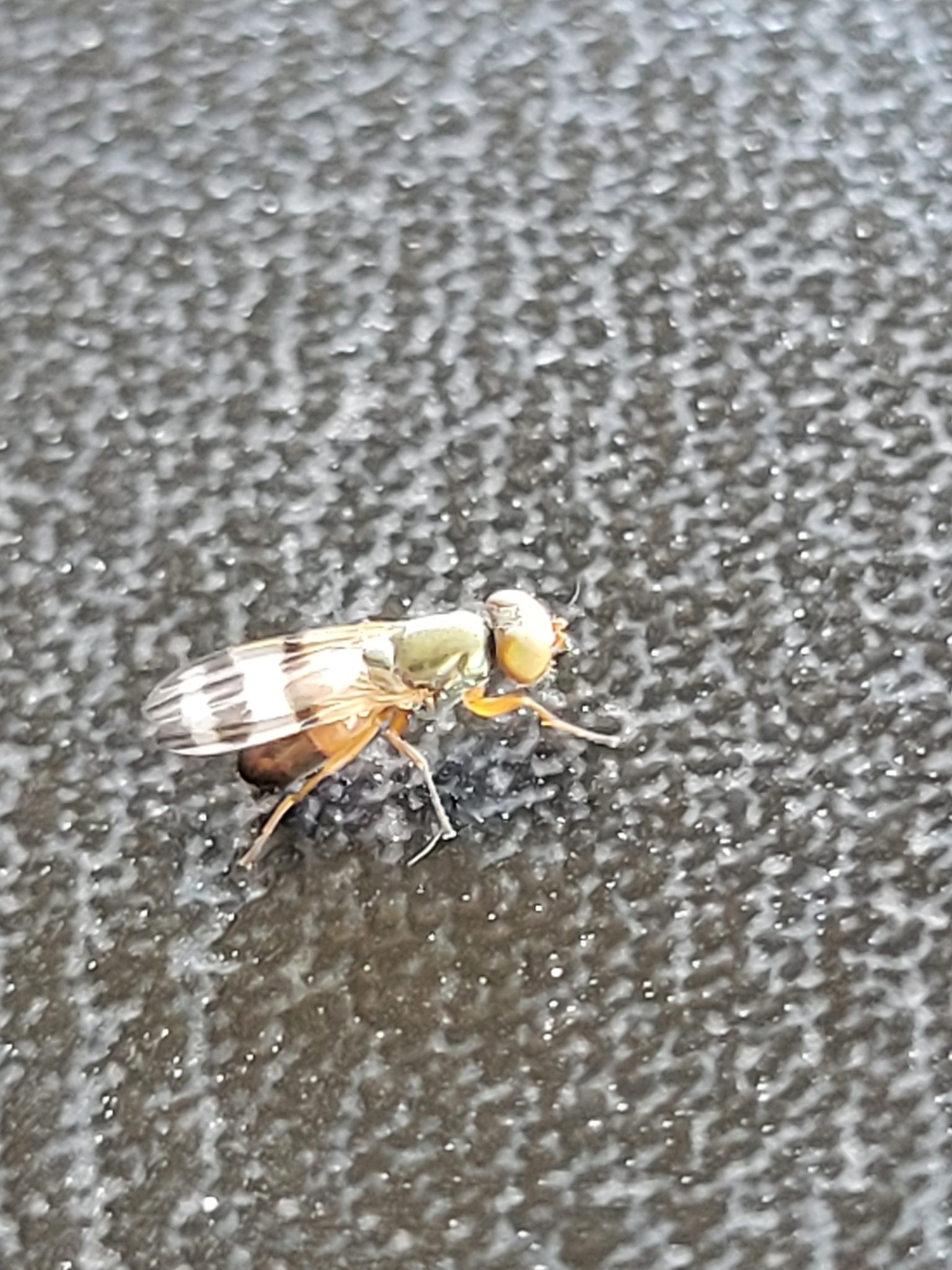

Scientific classification
- Kingdom: Animalia
- Phylum: Arthropoda
- Clade: Pancrustacea
- Class: Insecta
- Order: Diptera
- Family: Ulidiidae
- Genus: Chaetopsis
- Species: C. debilis

Binomial name
- Chaetopsis debilis Loew, 1868

= Chaetopsis debilis =

Species of fly

Chaetopsis debilis is a species of ulidiid or picture-winged fly in the family Tephritidae.
