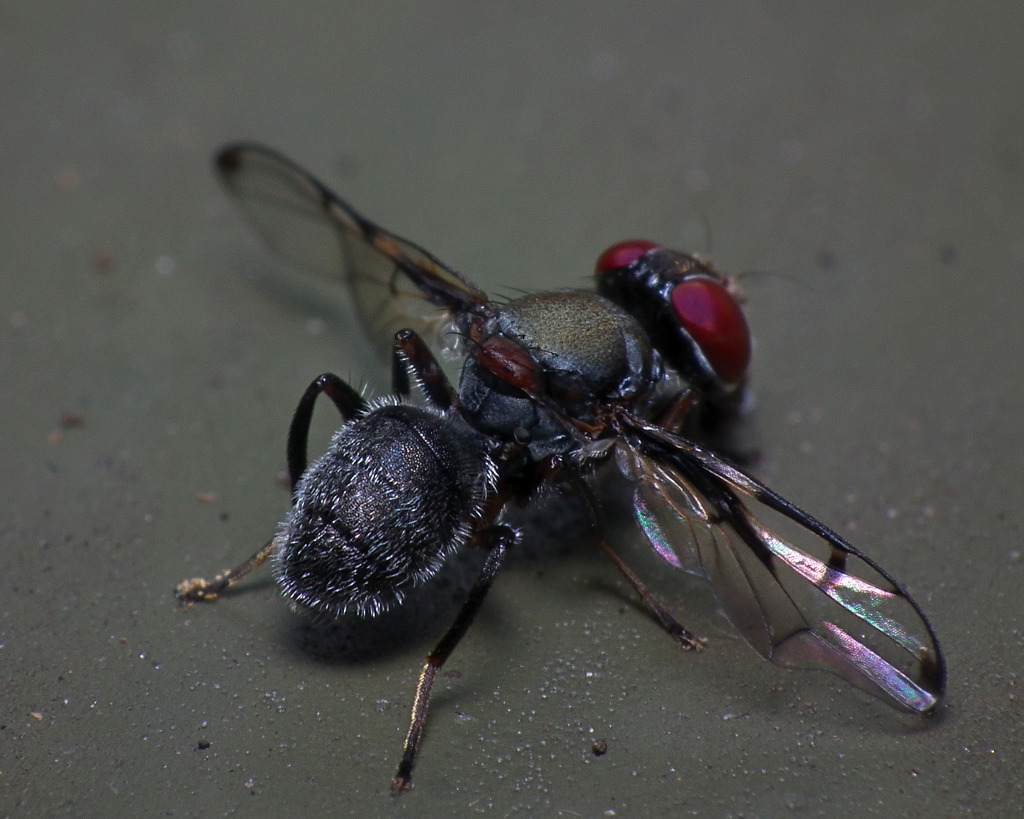
- Pogonortalis doclea

Scientific classification
- Domain: Eukaryota
- Kingdom: Animalia
- Phylum: Arthropoda
- Class: Insecta
- Order: Diptera
- Family: Platystomatidae
- Subfamily: Platystomatinae
- Genus: Pogonortalis; Hendel in de Meijere, 1911

= Pogonortalis =

Genus of flies

Pogonortalis is a genus of signal flies in the family Platystomatidae. There are about seven described species in Pogonortalis.

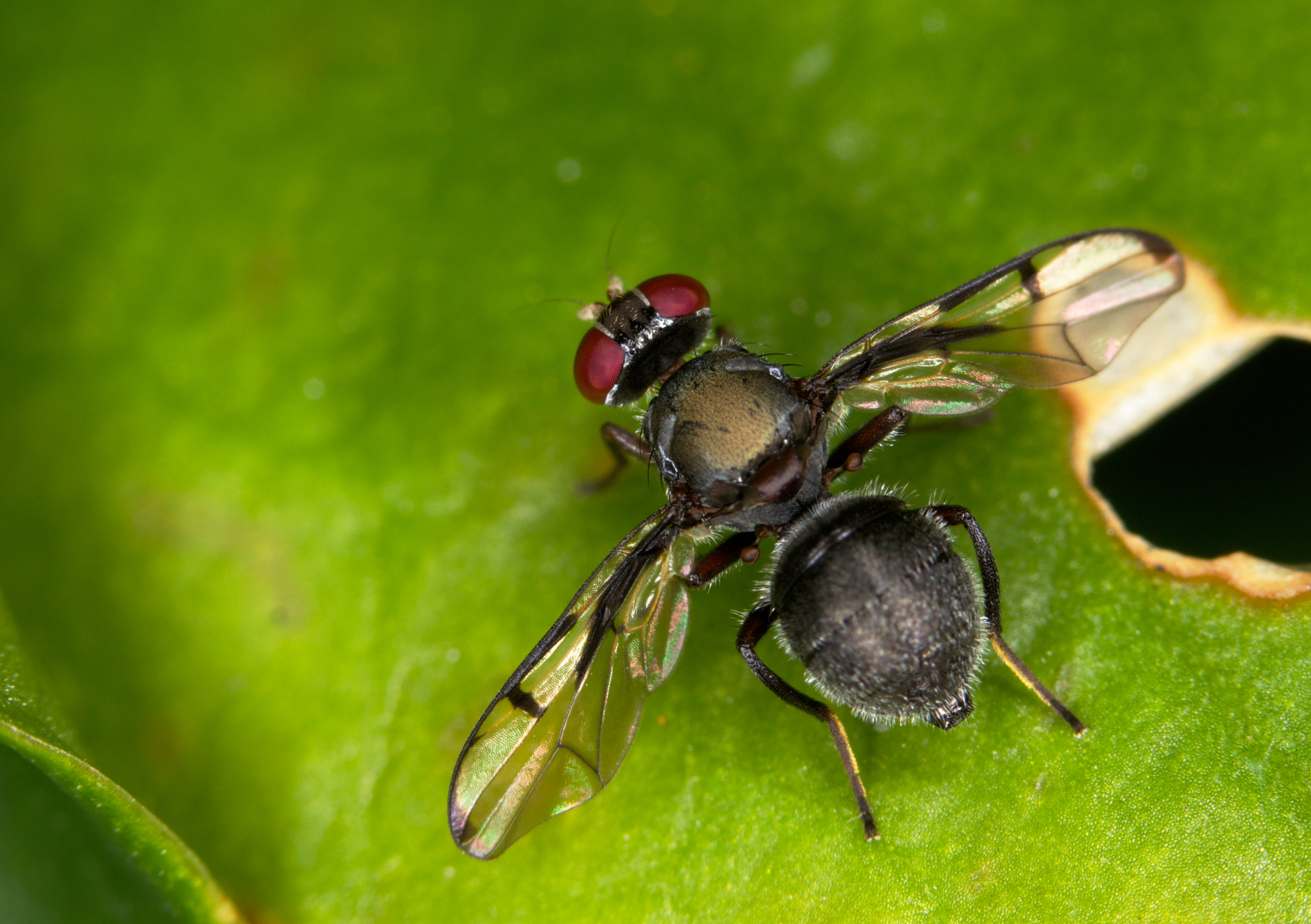
Pogonortalis doclea

== Species ==
These seven species belong to the genus Pogonortalis:

- P. commoni Paramonov, 1958^{c g}
- P. doclea (Walker, 1849)^{i c g b} (boatman fly)
- P. fulvofemoralis Malloch, 1942^{c g}
- P. hians Schneider & McAlpine, 1979^{c g}
- P. howei Paramonov, 1958^{c g}
- P. monteithi McAlpine, 2007^{c g}
- P. uncinata Meijere, 1911^{c g}

Data sources: i = ITIS, c = Catalogue of Life, g = GBIF, b = Bugguide.net
