= Pseudepicausta bigotii =

Scientific classification
- Kingdom: Animalia
- Phylum: Arthropoda
- Clade: Pancrustacea
- Class: Insecta
- Order: Diptera
- Family: Platystomatidae
- Genus: Pseudepicausta
- Species: P. bigotii

Binomial name
- Pseudepicausta bigotii (Macquart, 1851)

Synonyms
- Ortalis bigotii Macquart, 1851

Species of fly

Pseudepicausta bigotii is a species of fly in the genus Pseudepicausta of the family Platystomatidae.
