= Ortalis longicornis =

Scientific classification
- Kingdom: Animalia
- Phylum: Arthropoda
- Clade: Pancrustacea
- Class: Insecta
- Order: Diptera
- Family: Ulidiidae
- Genus: Ortalis
- Species: O. longicornis

Binomial name
- Ortalis longicornis Macquart, 1835

Species of fly

Ortalis longicornis is a species of fly in the genus Ortalis of the family Ulidiidae.
