= Traphera chalybea =

Scientific classification
- Kingdom: Animalia
- Phylum: Arthropoda
- Clade: Pancrustacea
- Class: Insecta
- Order: Diptera
- Family: Platystomatidae
- Genus: Traphera
- Species: T. chalybea

Binomial name
- Traphera chalybea (Wiedemann, 1830)

Synonyms
- Ortalis chalybea Wiedemann, 1830

Species of fly

Ortalis chalybea is a species of fly in the family Platystomatidae.
