= Ortalis flavoscutellata =

Scientific classification
- Kingdom: Animalia
- Phylum: Arthropoda
- Clade: Pancrustacea
- Class: Insecta
- Order: Diptera
- Family: Ulidiidae
- Genus: Ortalis
- Species: O. flavoscutellata

Binomial name
- Ortalis flavoscutellata

Species of fly

Ortalis flavoscutellata is a species of ulidiid or picture-winged fly in the genus Ortalis of the family Ulidiidae.
