= Atopognathus leucomerus =

Scientific classification
- Kingdom: Animalia
- Phylum: Arthropoda
- Clade: Pancrustacea
- Class: Insecta
- Order: Diptera
- Family: Platystomatidae
- Genus: Atopognathus
- Species: A. leucomerus

Binomial name
- Atopognathus leucomerus (Walker, 1864)

Synonyms
- Ortalis leucomerus Walker, 1864

Species of fly

Atopognathus leucomerus is a species of fly in the genus Atopognathus of the family Platystomatidae.
