= Eumecosomyia lacteivittata =

Scientific classification
- Domain: Eukaryota
- Kingdom: Animalia
- Phylum: Arthropoda
- Class: Insecta
- Order: Diptera
- Family: Ulidiidae
- Genus: Eumecosomyia
- Species: E. lacteivittata

Binomial name
- Eumecosomyia lacteivittata Hendel, 1909

Species of fly

Eumecosomyia lacteivittata is a species of ulidiid or picture-winged fly in the genus Eumecosomyia of the family Ulidiidae.
