= Rivellia ligata =

Scientific classification
- Kingdom: Animalia
- Phylum: Arthropoda
- Clade: Pancrustacea
- Class: Insecta
- Order: Diptera
- Family: Platystomatidae
- Genus: Rivellia
- Species: R. ligata

Binomial name
- Rivellia ligata (Say, 1830)

Synonyms
- Ortalis ligata Say, 1830

Species of fly

Rivellia ligata is a species of fly in the genus Rivellia of the family Platystomatidae.
