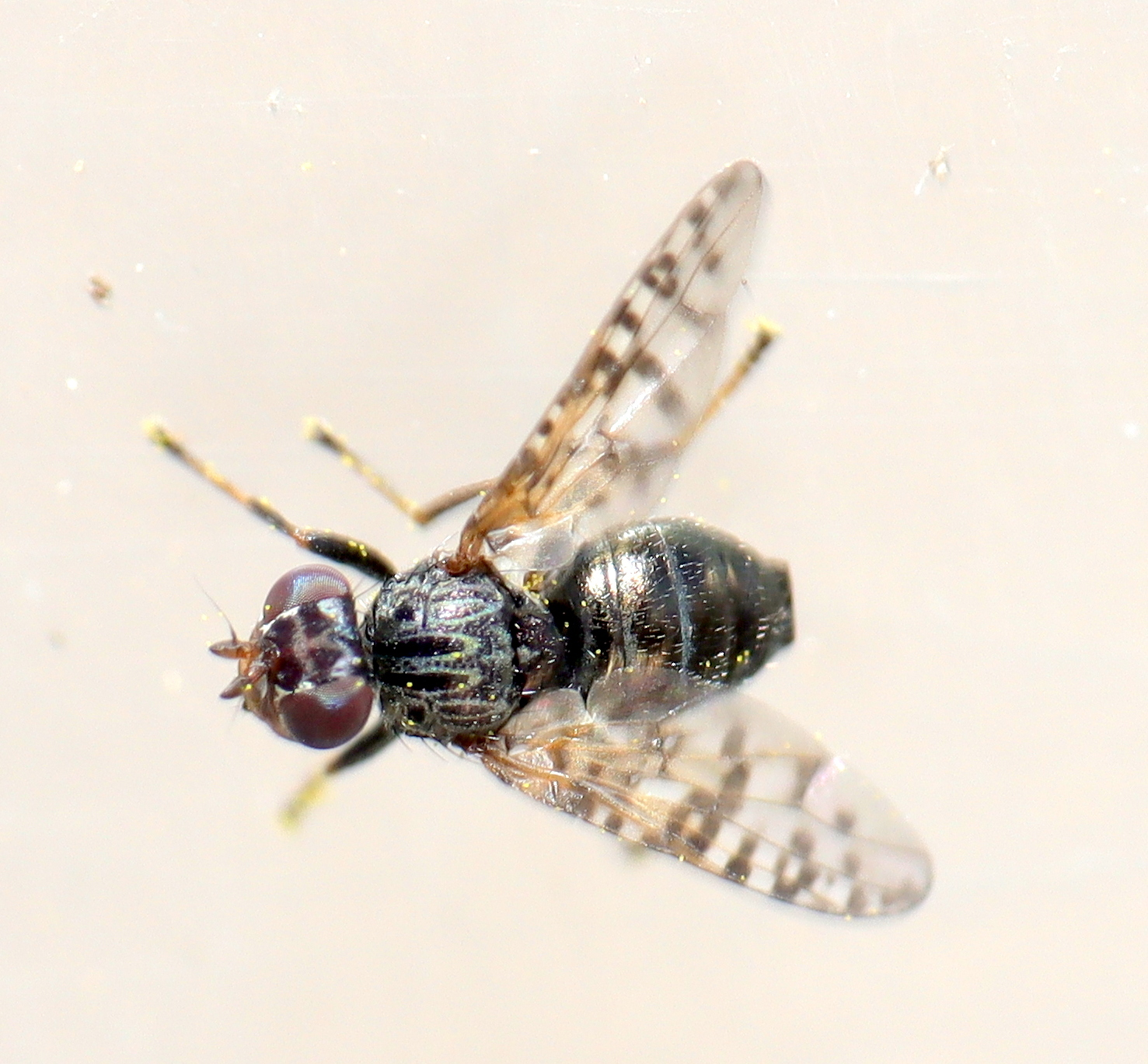
- Neoardelio aspalathus

Scientific classification
- Kingdom: Animalia
- Phylum: Arthropoda
- Class: Insecta
- Order: Diptera
- Family: Platystomatidae
- Subfamily: Platystomatinae
- Genus: Neoardelio; Hendel, 1914

Species
- See text

Synonyms
- Ardelio Loew, 1873

= Neoardelio =

Genus of insects

Neoardelio is a genus of signal flies in the family Platystomatidae. Species of the genus are endemic to southern Africa.

== Species ==
- Neoardelio alienus Frey, 1964
- Neoardelio alternatus (Walker, 1861)
- Neoardelio aspalathus Whittington, 2000
- Neoardelio brevicornis (Loew, 1873)
- Neoardelio inyangani Hancock, 1982
- Neoardelio lineatocollis (Thomson, 1869)
- Neoardelio longiala Steyskal, 1960
- Neoardelio longipennis (Loew, 1873)
- Neoardelio retifrons Steyskal, 1960
