= Cleitamia astrolabei =

Scientific classification
- Kingdom: Animalia
- Phylum: Arthropoda
- Clade: Pancrustacea
- Class: Insecta
- Order: Diptera
- Family: Platystomatidae
- Genus: Cleitamia
- Species: C. astrolabei

Binomial name
- Cleitamia astrolabei (Boisduval, 1835)

Synonyms
- Ortalis astrolabei Boisduval, 1835; Poticara triarcuata Walker, 1861; Cleitamia astrolabei Macquart, 1835

Species of fly

Cleitamia astrolabei is a species of fly in the genus Cleitamia of the family Platystomatidae.
