= Rhytidortalis conformis =

Scientific classification
- Kingdom: Animalia
- Phylum: Arthropoda
- Clade: Pancrustacea
- Class: Insecta
- Order: Diptera
- Family: Platystomatidae
- Genus: Rhytidortalis
- Species: R. conformis

Binomial name
- Rhytidortalis conformis (Walker, 1853)

Synonyms
- Ortalis conformis Walker, 1853

Species of ulidiid or picture-winged fly

Rhytidortalis conformis is a species of fly in the genus Rhytidortalis of the family Platystomatidae.
