= Atopognathus tarsalis =

Scientific classification
- Kingdom: Animalia
- Phylum: Arthropoda
- Clade: Pancrustacea
- Class: Insecta
- Order: Diptera
- Family: Platystomatidae
- Genus: Atopognathus
- Species: A. tarsalis

Binomial name
- Atopognathus tarsalis (Walker, 1861)

Synonyms
- Ortalis tarsalis Walker, 1861

Species of fly

Ortalis tarsalis is a species of fly in the genus Atopognathus of the family Platystomatidae.
