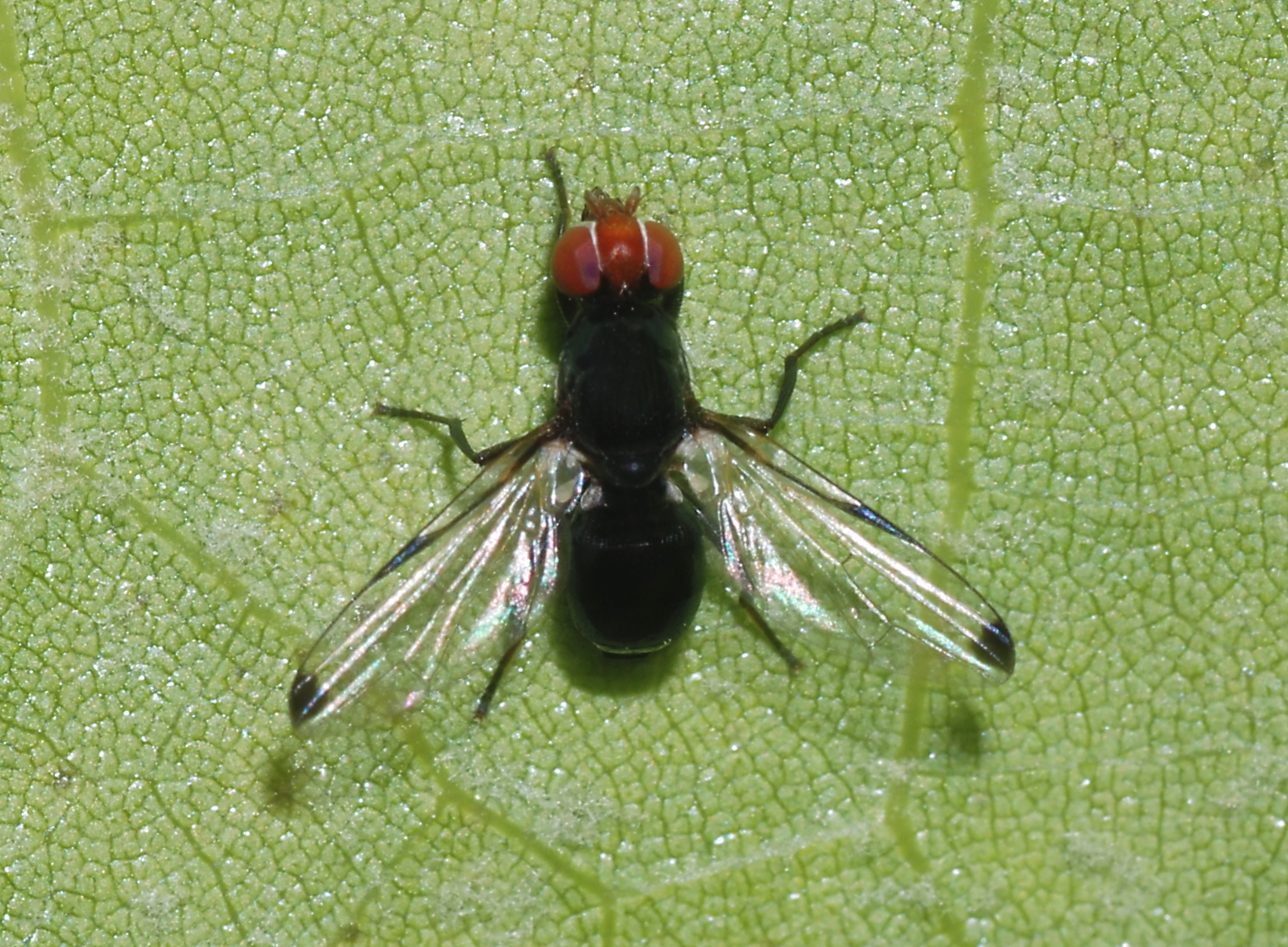

Scientific classification
- Kingdom: Animalia
- Phylum: Arthropoda
- Class: Insecta
- Order: Diptera
- Family: Ulidiidae
- Genus: Seioptera
- Species: S. vibrans

Binomial name
- Seioptera vibrans (Linnaeus, 1758)

Synonyms
- Musca vibrans Linnaeus, 1758

= Seioptera vibrans =

Species of fly

Seioptera vibrans is a species of ulidiid or picture-winged fly in the genus Seioptera of the family Ulidiidae.

The 5 to 6 mm long body is shiny black to blue, the head has a red forehead (frons) and a furrowed face. Both wings are transparent and tipped with a dark spot. The adults fly from May to September near trees, bushes, hedges; once landed, they wave their wings constantly. They feed on flower pollen and small insects ( aphids ). The larvae live in litter (decomposing plants that they help to transform).
