= Rivellia mentissa =

Scientific classification
- Kingdom: Animalia
- Phylum: Arthropoda
- Clade: Pancrustacea
- Class: Insecta
- Order: Diptera
- Family: Platystomatidae
- Genus: Rivellia
- Species: R. mentissa

Binomial name
- Rivellia mentissa (Walker, 1849)

Synonyms
- Ortalis mentissa Walker, 1849

Species of fly

Rivellia mentissa is a species of fly in the genus Rivellia of the family Platystomatidae.
