= Rivellia vacillans =

Scientific classification
- Kingdom: Animalia
- Phylum: Arthropoda
- Clade: Pancrustacea
- Class: Insecta
- Order: Diptera
- Family: Platystomatidae
- Genus: Rivellia
- Species: R. vacillans

Binomial name
- Rivellia vacillans (Walker, 1860)

Synonyms
- Ortalis vacillans Walker, 1860

Species of fly

Rivellia vacillans is a species of fly in the genus Rivellia of the family Platystomatidae.
