= Euxestomoea prompta =

Scientific classification
- Kingdom: Animalia
- Phylum: Arthropoda
- Clade: Pancrustacea
- Class: Insecta
- Order: Diptera
- Family: Platystomatidae
- Genus: Euxestomoea
- Species: E. prompta

Binomial name
- Euxestomoea prompta (Walker, 1859)

Synonyms
- Ortalis prompta Walker, 1859

Species of fly

Euxestomoea prompta is a species of fly in the genus Euxestomoea of the family Platystomatidae.
