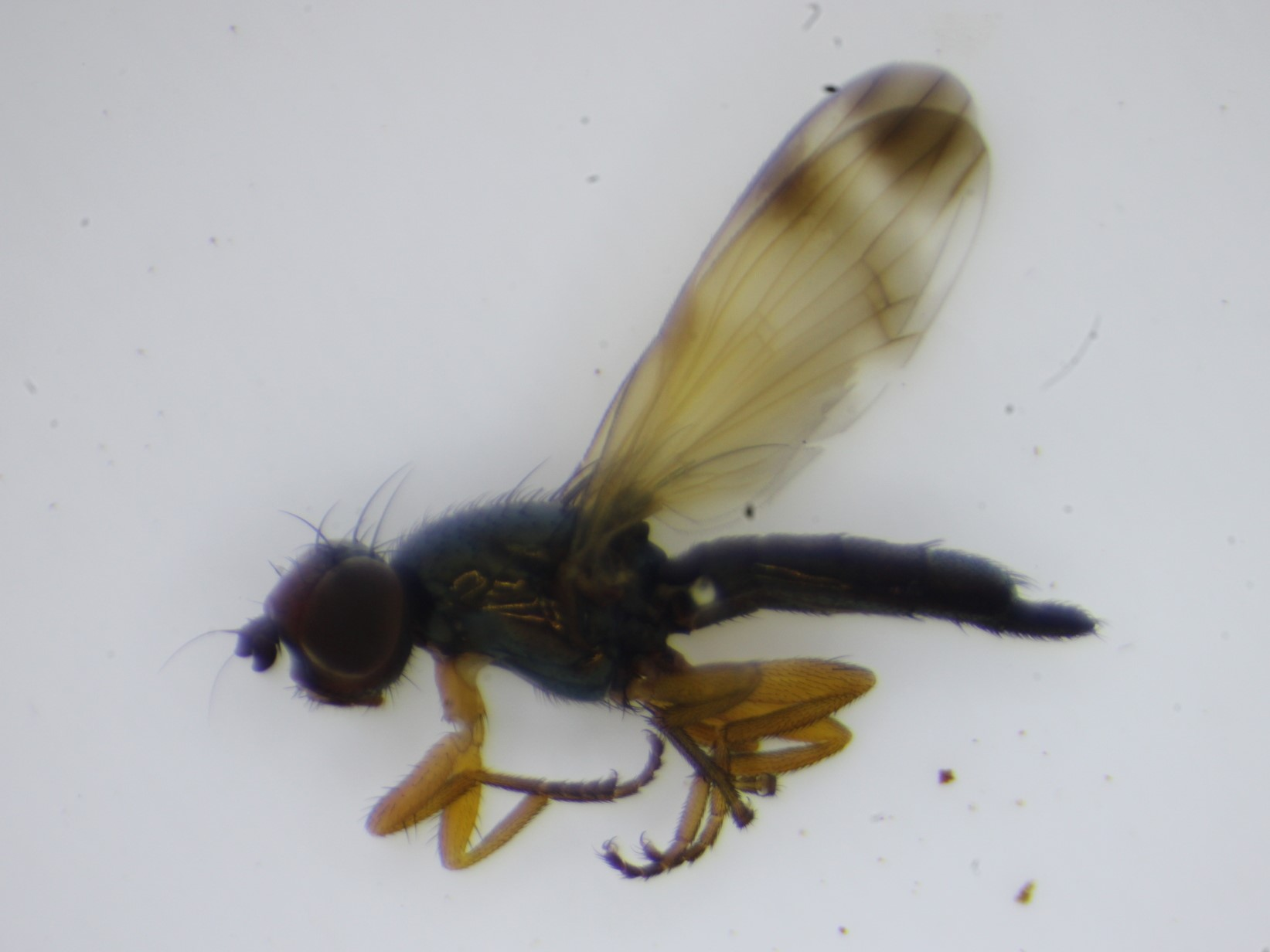

Scientific classification
- Kingdom: Animalia
- Phylum: Arthropoda
- Class: Insecta
- Order: Diptera
- Family: Ulidiidae
- Genus: Chaetopsis
- Species: C. apicalis

Binomial name
- Chaetopsis apicalis Johnson, 1900

= Chaetopsis apicalis =

Species of fly

Chaetopsis apicalis is a species of ulidiid or picture-winged fly in the family Tephritidae.
