= Seioptera importans =

Scientific classification
- Kingdom: Animalia
- Phylum: Arthropoda
- Clade: Pancrustacea
- Class: Insecta
- Order: Diptera
- Family: Ulidiidae
- Genus: Seioptera
- Species: S. importans

Binomial name
- Seioptera importans Hennig, 1941

Species of fly

Seioptera importans is a species of ulidiid or picture-winged fly in the genus Seioptera of the family Ulidiidae.
