= Engistoneura parallela =

Scientific classification
- Kingdom: Animalia
- Phylum: Arthropoda
- Clade: Pancrustacea
- Class: Insecta
- Order: Diptera
- Family: Platystomatidae
- Genus: Engistoneura
- Species: E. parallela

Binomial name
- Engistoneura parallela (Wiedemann, 1830)

Synonyms
- Ortalis parallela Wiedemann, 1830

Species of fly

Engistoneura parallela is a species of fly in the genus Engistoneura of the family Platystomatidae.
