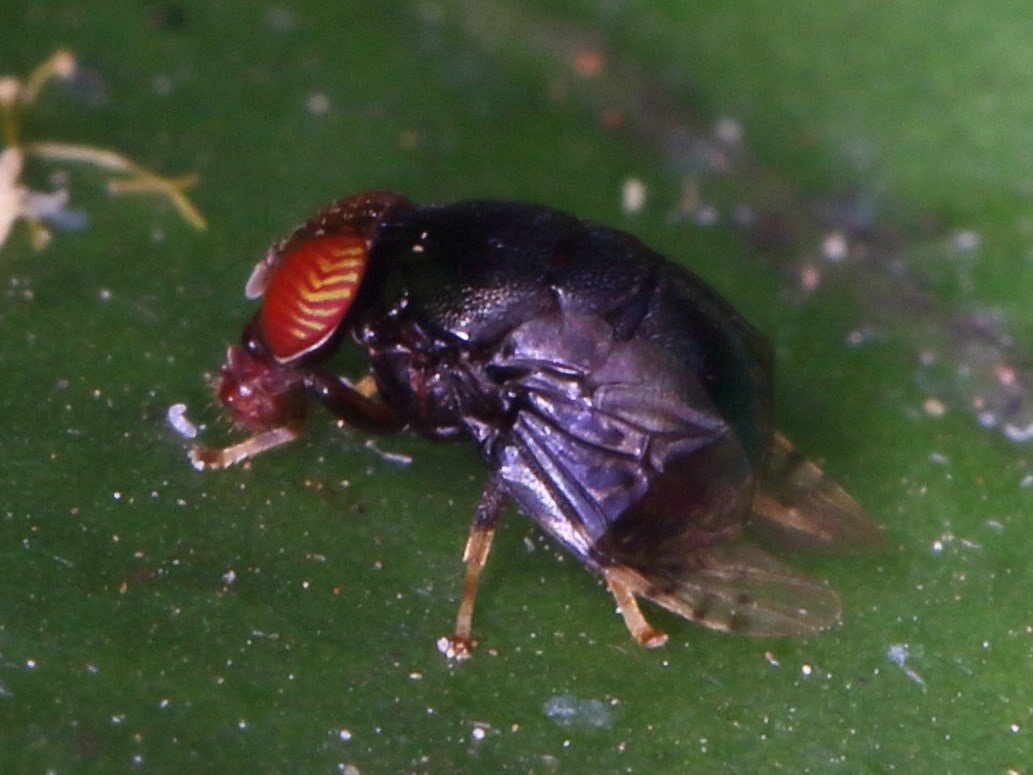
- Naupoda inscripta

Scientific classification
- Kingdom: Animalia
- Phylum: Arthropoda
- Class: Insecta
- Order: Diptera
- Family: Platystomatidae
- Subfamily: Scholastinae; Enderlein, 1924

= Scholastinae =

Subfamily of flies

Scholastinae is a subfamily of flies in the signal fly family Platystomatidae, which currently includes 14 genera.

== Subfamily classification ==
The Platystomatidae were comprehensively divided into five subfamilies, but more recent reviews of morphology suggest that some aspects of this classification are unsatisfactory. This led to reducing the number of subfamilies to four, being the Plastotephritinae, Platystomatinae, Scholastinae and Trapherinae - Angitulinae being subsumed into Platystomatinae.

Nonetheless, definition of the subfamily Scholastinae is still open to debate and requires phylogenetic confirmation. At present, genera assigned to the subfamily are considered as having the following subset of characters: fully developed calypters, tergite 5 much shorter than tergite 3 (especially in females where it may be absent), distiphallus terminating at the glans often with terminal filaments and tergite 6 in the female abdomen absent. Although McAlpine rejected the use of the presence of an anepisternal (=sternopleural) seta, Whittington more recently continued to use it as it provides an additional character besides those given above, all of which are transitional to some extent in the other subfamilies of the Platystomatidae. In particular, head and genitalic morphology, and perhaps larval biology once more of this is known, should play a role in the definition of the subfamilies, the debate for which remains open.

Three of the 14 genera in the Scholastinae are monotypic: Chaetorivellia, Pseudoscholastes and Tomeus.

== Biology ==
Little is known of the biology of Scholastines. Adults have been taken on leaves of bananas - Musa Musa, rubber - Hevea Hevea, coconuts - Cocos Cocos, Xanthorrhoea Xanthorrhoea, Eucalyptus Eucalyptus and Macrozamia Macrozamia. Habitats in which they are encountered range therefore from rainforest, dry forests, coastal forest, coastal heaths, and agricultural land. Larvae are sometimes associated with the sap runs of boring beetles, but the association is unclear and requires further investigation.

== Biogeography ==
Without doubt, the largest concentration of species of Scholastinae occurs in the Australasian region. The subfamily is entirely absent from the Americas and the Palaearctic. There are five genera known from the Afrotropical region, seven from the Oriental (five of which also occur in the Australasia region) and 12 from Australasia. Naupoda and Scholastes are the only two genera to be distributed across all three regions and Paryphodes is found in both the Afrotropical and Australasian regions.

== Genera ==
- Asyntona Osten-Sacken, 1881
- Chaetorivellia Hendel in de Meijere, 1913
- Lenophila Guérin-Méneville, 1843
- Mesoctenia Enderlein, 1924
- Naupoda Osten-Sacken, 1881
- Neohemigaster Malloch, 1939
- Parardelio Hendel, 1912
- Paryphodes Speiser, 1911
- Pseudoscholastes Frey, 1932
- Pterogenia Bigot, 1859
- Scholastes Loew, 1873
- Tomeus McAlpine, 2001
- Trigonosoma Gray, in Griffith & Pidgeon, 1832
- Zygaenula Doleschall, 1859
