= Rivellia decatomoides =

Scientific classification
- Kingdom: Animalia
- Phylum: Arthropoda
- Clade: Pancrustacea
- Class: Insecta
- Order: Diptera
- Family: Platystomatidae
- Genus: Rivellia
- Species: R. decatomoides

Binomial name
- Rivellia decatomoides (Walker, 1860)

Synonyms
- Ortalis decatomoides Walker, 1860

Species of fly

Rivellia decatomoides is a species of fly in the genus Rivellia of the family Platystomatidae.
