= Pseudoedaspis oreiplana =

Scientific classification
- Kingdom: Animalia
- Phylum: Arthropoda
- Class: Insecta
- Order: Diptera
- Family: Tephritidae
- Subfamily: Tephritinae
- Tribe: Tephritini
- Genus: Pseudoedaspis
- Species: P. oreiplana

Binomial name
- Pseudoedaspis oreiplana (Kieffer & Jörgensen, 1910)

Synonyms
- Trypeta oreiplana Kieffer & Jörgensen, 1910

Species of fly

Pseudoedaspis oreiplana is a species of tephritid or fruit flies in the genus Pseudoedaspis of the family Tephritidae.

== Distribution ==
Argentina.
