= Chaetopsis quadrifasciata =

Scientific classification
- Kingdom: Animalia
- Phylum: Arthropoda
- Class: Insecta
- Order: Diptera
- Family: Ulidiidae
- Genus: Chaetopsis
- Species: C. quadrifasciata

Binomial name
- Chaetopsis quadrifasciata Curran, 1928

Species of fly

Chaetopsis quadrifasciata is a species of ulidiid or picture-winged fly in the family Ulidiidae.
