= Rivellia bipars =

Scientific classification
- Kingdom: Animalia
- Phylum: Arthropoda
- Clade: Pancrustacea
- Class: Insecta
- Order: Diptera
- Family: Platystomatidae
- Genus: Rivellia
- Species: R. bipars

Binomial name
- Rivellia bipars (Walker, 1861)

Synonyms
- Ortalis bipars Walker, 1861

Species of fly

Rivellia bipars is a species of fly in the genus Rivellia of the family Platystomatidae.
