= Seioptera demonstrans =

Scientific classification
- Kingdom: Animalia
- Phylum: Arthropoda
- Clade: Pancrustacea
- Class: Insecta
- Order: Diptera
- Family: Ulidiidae
- Genus: Seioptera
- Species: S. demonstrans

Binomial name
- Seioptera demonstrans Enderlein, 1928

Species of fly

Seioptera demonstrans is a species of ulidiid or picture-winged fly in the genus Seioptera of the family Ulidiidae.
