= Ortalis dispila =

Scientific classification
- Kingdom: Animalia
- Phylum: Arthropoda
- Clade: Pancrustacea
- Class: Insecta
- Order: Diptera
- Family: Ulidiidae
- Genus: Ortalis
- Species: O. dispila

Binomial name
- Ortalis dispila

Species of fly

Ortalis dispila is a species of fly in the genus Ortalis of the family Ulidiidae.
