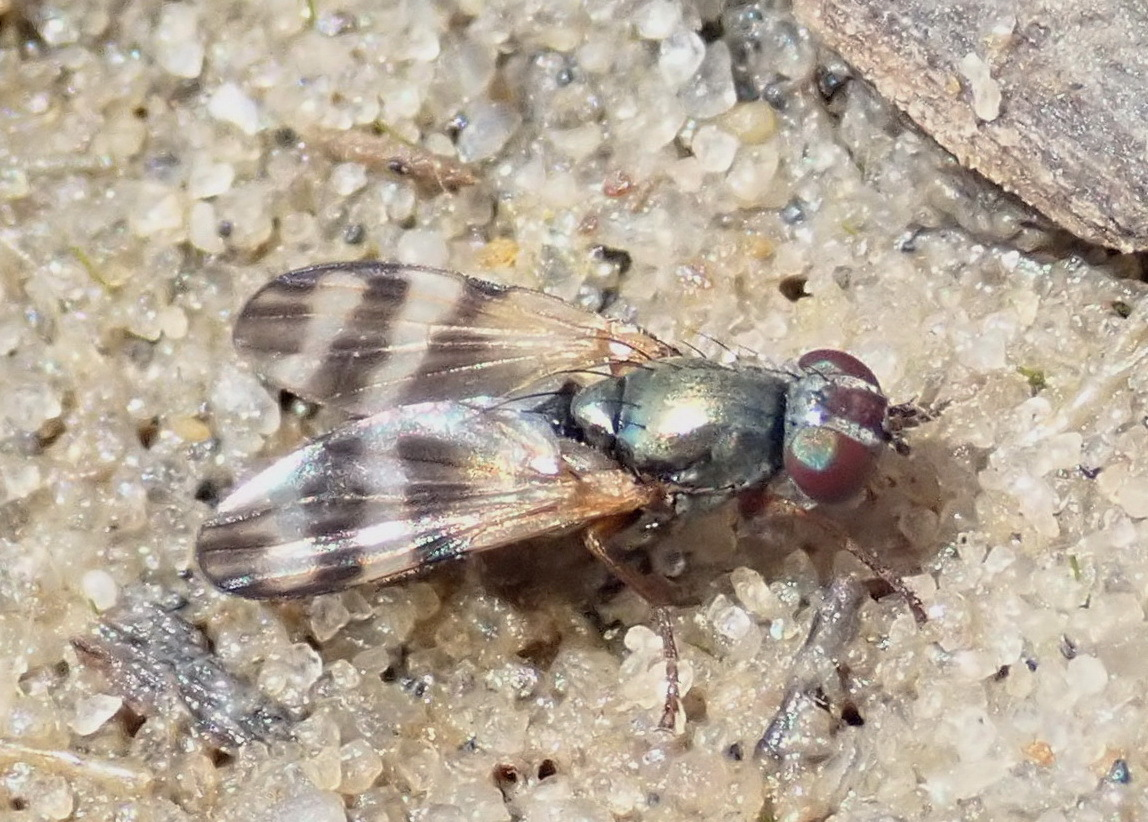

Scientific classification
- Kingdom: Animalia
- Phylum: Arthropoda
- Clade: Pancrustacea
- Class: Insecta
- Order: Diptera
- Family: Ulidiidae
- Genus: Chaetopsis
- Species: C. aenea

Binomial name
- Chaetopsis aenea (Wiedemann, 1830)

Synonyms
- Ortalis aenea Wiedemann, 1830; Ortalis trifasciata Wiedemann, 1830

= Chaetopsis aenea =

Species of insect

Chaetopsis aenea is a species of ulidiid or picture-winged fly in the genus Chaetopsis of the family Ulidiidae.
