= Otites snowi =

Scientific classification
- Kingdom: Animalia
- Phylum: Arthropoda
- Class: Insecta
- Order: Diptera
- Family: Ulidiidae
- Genus: Otites
- Species: O. snowi

Binomial name
- Otites snowi (Cresson, 1924)

Synonyms
- Ortalis snowi Cresson, 1924

Species of fly

Otites snowi is a species of picture-winged fly in the genus Otites of the family Ulidiidae.
