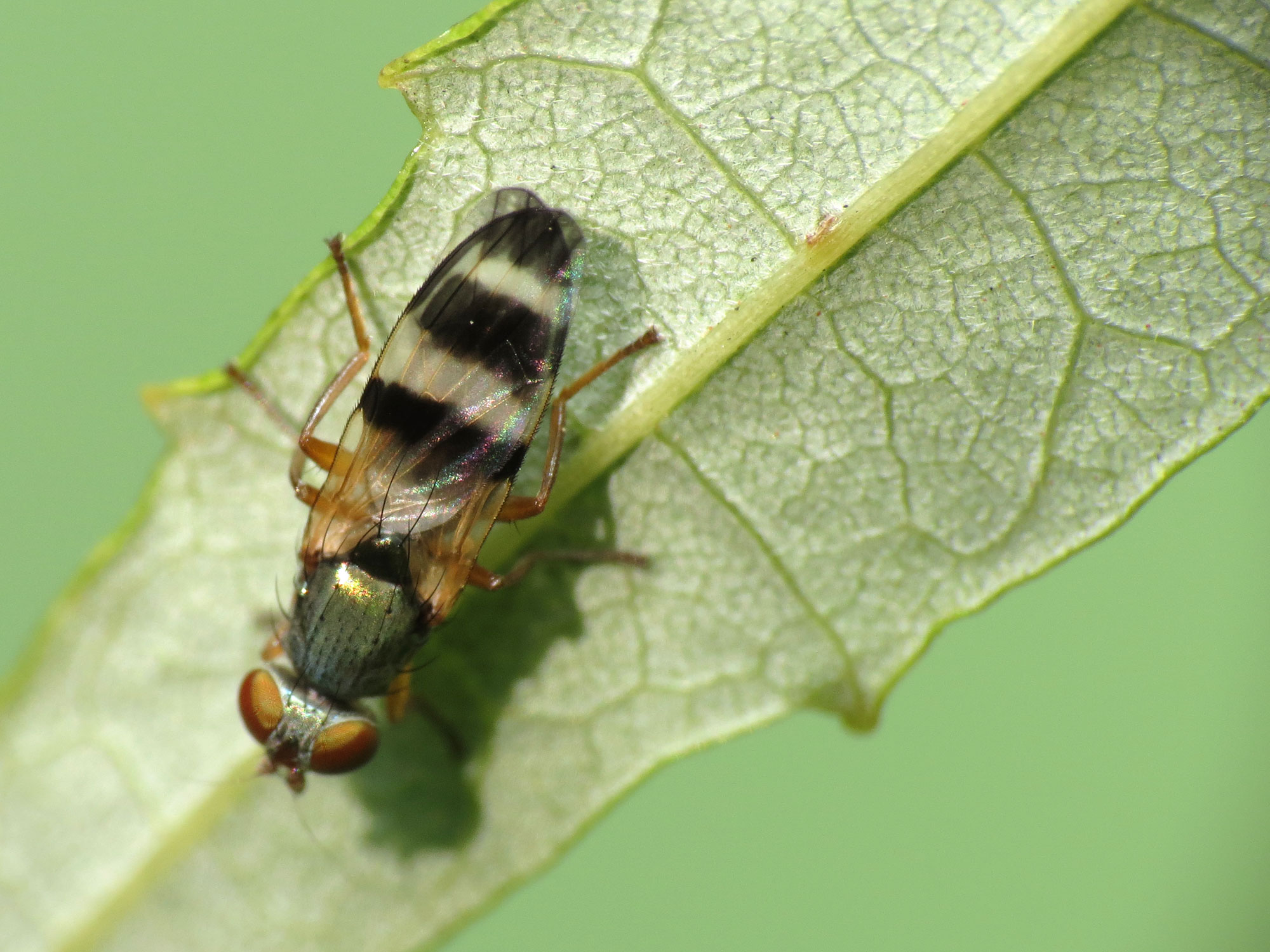
- Chaetopsis sp.

Scientific classification
- Kingdom: Animalia
- Phylum: Arthropoda
- Clade: Pancrustacea
- Class: Insecta
- Order: Diptera
- Family: Ulidiidae
- Subfamily: Ulidiinae
- Tribe: Lipsanini
- Genus: Chaetopsis; Loew, 1868

= Chaetopsis =

Genus of flies

Chaetopsis is a genus of ulidiid or picture-winged fly in the family Ulidiidae.

== Species ==
- Chaetopsis aenea (Wiedemann, 1830)
- Chaetopsis angusta Hendel, 1909
- Chaetopsis anomalipennis (Malloch, 1933)
- Chaetopsis apicalis Johnson, 1900
- Chaetopsis armaticornis (Malloch, 1933)
- Chaetopsis debilis Loew, 1868
- Chaetopsis duplicata Johnson, 1921
- Chaetopsis fulvifrons (Macquart, 1855)
- Chaetopsis hendeli Johnson, 1913
- Chaetopsis magna Cresson, 1924
- Chaetopsis massyla (Walker, 1849)
- Chaetopsis mucronata Hendel, 1909
- Chaetopsis praeceps Hendel, 1909
- Chaetopsis quadrifasciata Curran, 1928
