= Otites stigma =

Scientific classification
- Kingdom: Animalia
- Phylum: Arthropoda
- Clade: Pancrustacea
- Class: Insecta
- Order: Diptera
- Family: Ulidiidae
- Genus: Otites
- Species: O. stigma

Binomial name
- Otites stigma (Hendel, 1911)

Synonyms
- Ortalis stigma Hendel, 1911

Species of fly

Otites stigma is a species of ulidiid or picture-winged fly in the genus Otites of the family Ulidiidae.
