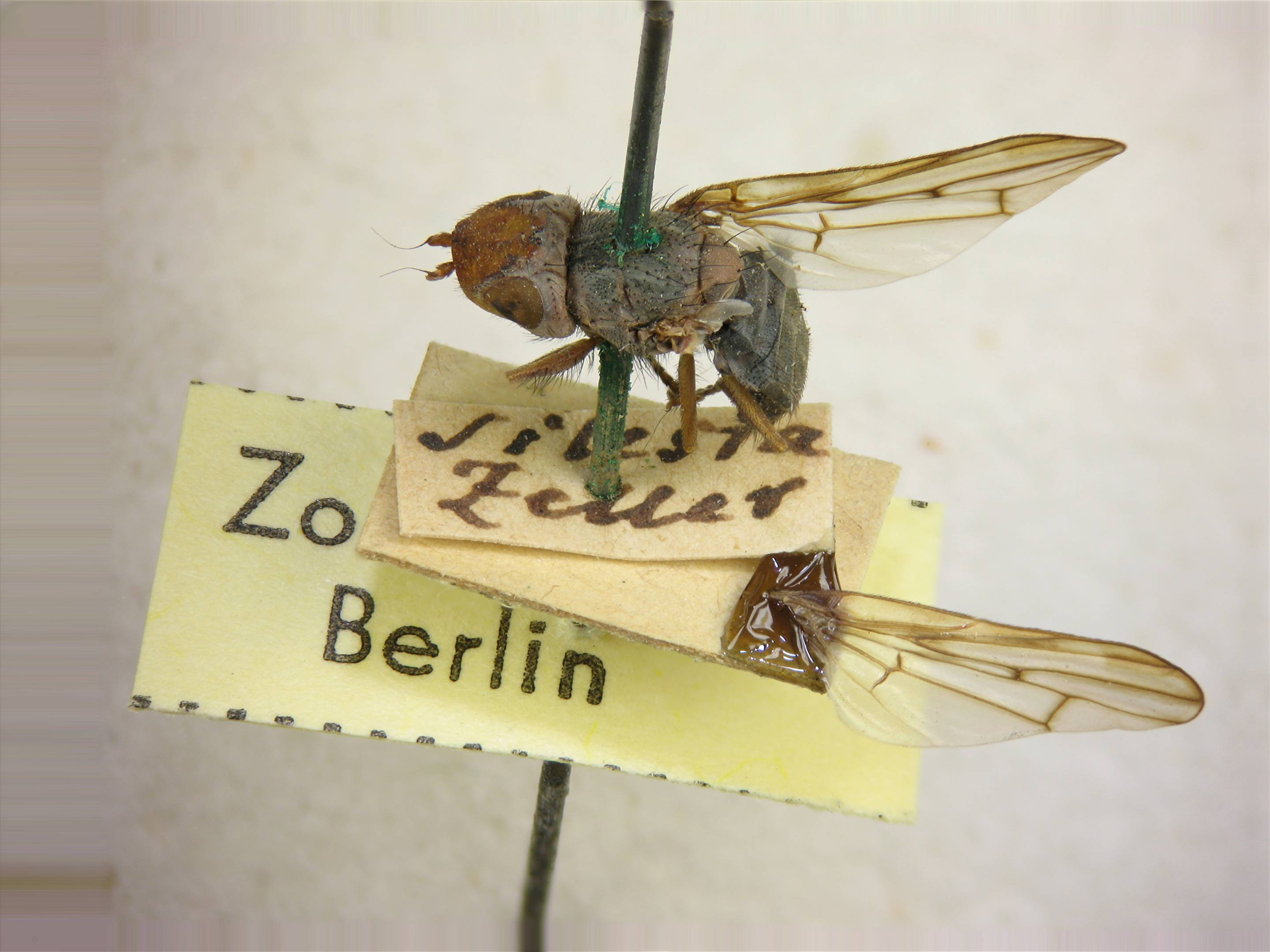
- Specimen of Otites nebulosa, H. Loew collection, Berlin

Scientific classification
- Kingdom: Animalia
- Phylum: Arthropoda
- Class: Insecta
- Order: Diptera
- Family: Ulidiidae
- Genus: Otites
- Species: O. nebulosa

Binomial name
- Otites nebulosa (Latreille, 1811)

Synonyms
- Sciomyza bucephala Meigen, 1830

= Otites nebulosa =

Species of fly

Otites nebulosa is a species of ulidiid or picture-winged fly in the genus Otites of the family Ulidiidae.
