= Automola =

Scientific classification
- Kingdom: Animalia
- Phylum: Arthropoda
- Class: Insecta
- Order: Diptera
- Family: Richardiidae
- Genus: Automola; Loew, 1873

Genus of flies

Automola is a genus of flies in the family Richardiidae. There are at least three described species in Automola.

== Species ==
These three species belong to the genus Automola:

- A. atomaria (Wiedemann, 1830)^{c g}
- A. caloptera (Bigot, 1886)^{c g}
- A. rufa Cresson, 1906^{i c g b}

Data sources: i = ITIS, c = Catalogue of Life, g = GBIF, b = Bugguide.net
