= Herina tristis =

Scientific classification
- Kingdom: Animalia
- Phylum: Arthropoda
- Class: Insecta
- Order: Diptera
- Family: Ulidiidae
- Genus: Herina
- Species: H. tristis

Binomial name
- Herina tristis (Meigen, 1826)

Synonyms
- Ortalis bifasciata Loew, 1858; Ortalis gyrans Loew, 1864; Ortalis tristis Meigen, 1826

Species of fly

Herina tristis is a species of picture-winged fly in the genus Herina of the family Ulidiidae found in most of Western Europe.
