= Seioptera costalis =

Scientific classification
- Kingdom: Animalia
- Phylum: Arthropoda
- Class: Insecta
- Order: Diptera
- Family: Ulidiidae
- Genus: Seioptera
- Species: S. costalis

Binomial name
- Seioptera costalis (Walker, 1849)

Synonyms
- Ortalis costalis Walker, 1849

Species of fly

Seioptera costalis is a species of ulidiid or picture-winged fly in the genus Seioptera of the family Ulidiidae.
