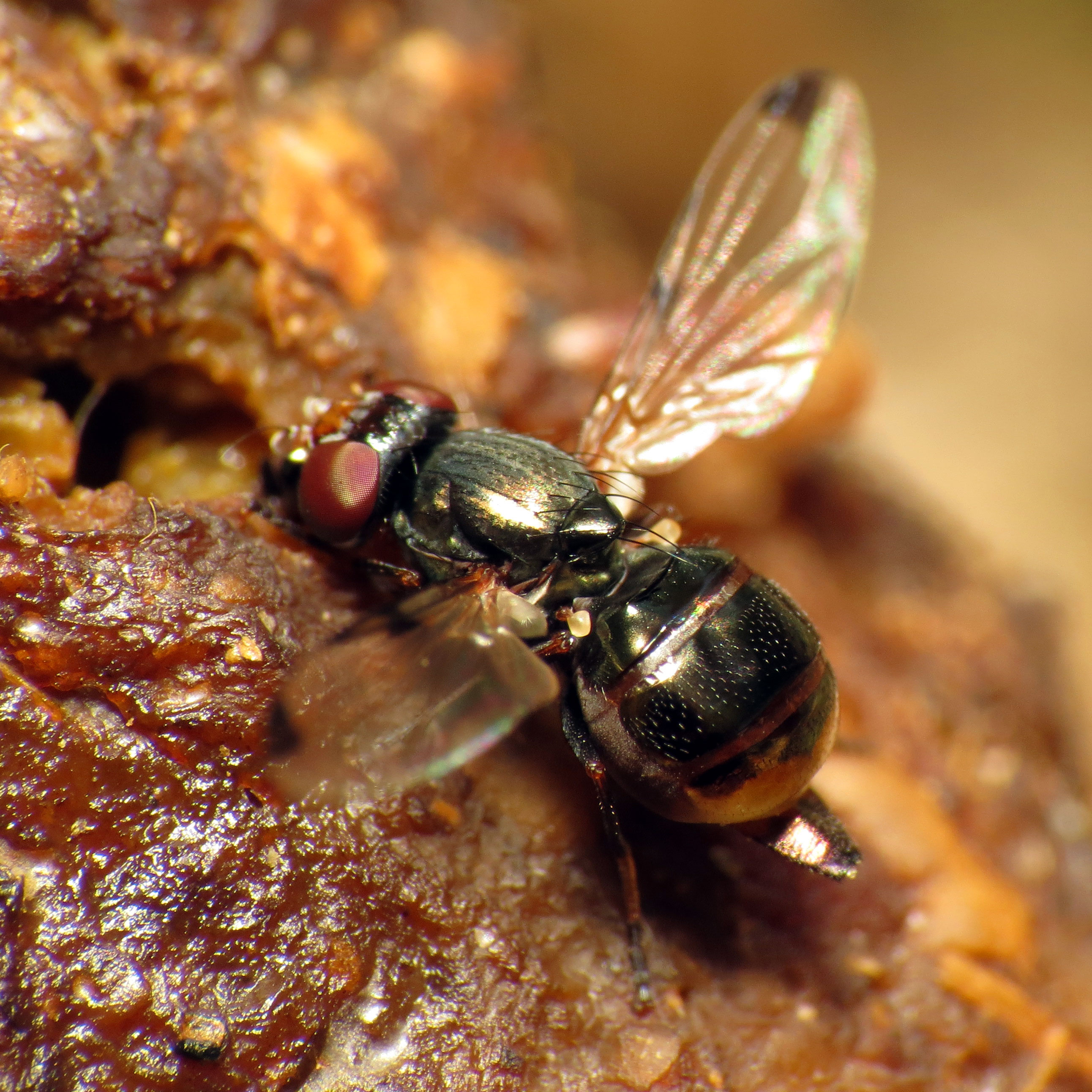

Scientific classification
- Domain: Eukaryota
- Kingdom: Animalia
- Phylum: Arthropoda
- Class: Insecta
- Order: Diptera
- Family: Ulidiidae
- Genus: Euxesta
- Species: E. notata

Binomial name
- Euxesta notata (Wiedemann, 1830)

Synonyms
- Ortalis notata Wiedemann, 1830

= Euxesta notata =

Species of fly

Euxesta notata is a species of ulidiid or picture-winged fly in the genus Euxesta of the family Ulidiidae. It is found in Canada. As a larva it is referred to as the spotted root maggot, and has evolved genetic resistance against DDT.
