= Ceroxys cinifera =

Scientific classification
- Kingdom: Animalia
- Phylum: Arthropoda
- Class: Insecta
- Order: Diptera
- Family: Ulidiidae
- Subfamily: Otitinae
- Tribe: Otitini
- Genus: Ceroxys
- Species: C. cinifera

Binomial name
- Ceroxys cinifera (Loew, 1846)

Synonyms
- Ortalis cinifera Loew, 1846

Species of fly

Ceroxys cinifera is a species of picture-winged fly in the genus Ceroxys of the family Ulidiidae.

== Distribution ==
C. cinifera has been recorded in Ukraine and Southern Russia.
