= Idana =

Scientific classification
- Kingdom: Animalia
- Phylum: Arthropoda
- Class: Insecta
- Order: Diptera
- Family: Ulidiidae
- Genus: Idana; Loew, 1873
- Species: I. marginata

Binomial name
- Idana marginata (Say, 1830)

Synonyms
- Ortalis marginata Say, 1830

Genus of flies

Idana is a monotypic genus of picture-winged flies, family Ulidiidae. The sole species is Idana marginata.

Idana marginata is found in the United States and Canada. It is one of the largest ulidiid flies in eastern North America, reaching a length of over 10 mm (0.39 in).
