= Pseudoedaspis =

Scientific classification
- Kingdom: Animalia
- Phylum: Arthropoda
- Class: Insecta
- Order: Diptera
- Family: Tephritidae
- Subfamily: Tephritinae
- Tribe: Tephritini
- Genus: Pseudoedaspis; Hendel, 1914

Type species
- Pseudoedaspis biseta Hendel, 1914

Genus of flies

Pseudoedaspis is a genus of tephritid or fruit flies in the family Tephritidae.

== Species ==
- Pseudoedaspis biseta Hendel, 1914
- Pseudoedaspis decorata (Blanchard, 1854)
- Pseudoedaspis mendozana Aczél, 1953
- Pseudoedaspis oreiplana (Kieffer & Jörgensen, 1910)
- Pseudoedaspis striolata (Blanchard, 1854)
