= Euxesta leucomelas =

Scientific classification
- Kingdom: Animalia
- Phylum: Arthropoda
- Class: Insecta
- Order: Diptera
- Family: Ulidiidae
- Genus: Euxesta
- Species: E. leucomelas

Binomial name
- Euxesta leucomelas (Walker, 1860)

Synonyms
- Ortalis leucomelas Walker, 1860; Euxesta fascipennis Wulp, 1899

Species of fly

Euxesta leucomelas is a species of ulidiid or picture-winged fly in the genus Euxesta of the family Ulidiidae. Its distribution is in Mexico, Central America and South America.
