= Euxesta basalis =

Scientific classification
- Kingdom: Animalia
- Phylum: Arthropoda
- Clade: Pancrustacea
- Class: Insecta
- Order: Diptera
- Family: Ulidiidae
- Genus: Euxesta
- Species: E. basalis

Binomial name
- Euxesta basalis (Walker, 1852)

Synonyms
- Ortalis basalis Walker, 1853; Amethysa basalis (Walker, 1853)

Species of fly

Euxesta basalis is a species of ulidiid or picture-winged fly in the genus Euxesta of the family Ulidiidae. It was described by Francis Walker in 1853.
