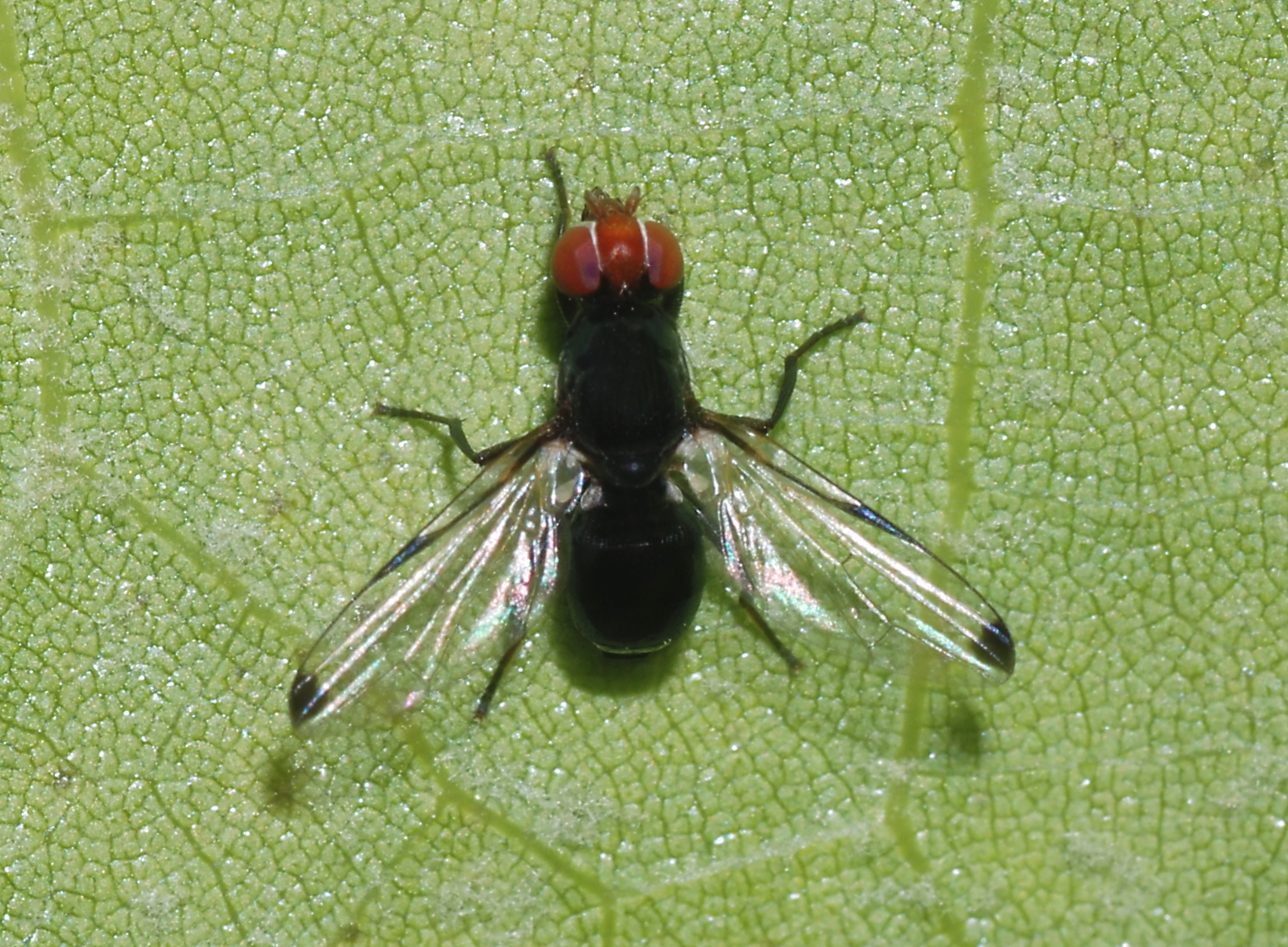
- Seioptera vibrans

Scientific classification
- Kingdom: Animalia
- Phylum: Arthropoda
- Class: Insecta
- Order: Diptera
- Family: Ulidiidae
- Subfamily: Ulidiinae
- Tribe: Seiopterini
- Genus: Seioptera; Kirby & Spence, 1817

= Seioptera =

Genus of flies

Seioptera is a genus of picture-winged flies in the family Ulidiidae.

== Species ==
There are five recognized species:

- Seioptera colon Loew, 1868
- Seioptera costalis (Walker, 1849)
- Seioptera demonstrans Hennig, 1941
- Seioptera importans Hennig, 1941
- Seioptera vibrans (Linnaeus, 1758)
