= Herina lacustris =

Scientific classification
- Kingdom: Animalia
- Phylum: Arthropoda
- Class: Insecta
- Order: Diptera
- Family: Ulidiidae
- Genus: Herina
- Species: H. lacustris

Binomial name
- Herina lacustris (Meigen, 1826)

Synonyms
- Ortalis lacustris Meigen, 1826

Species of fly

Herina lacustris is a species of picture-winged fly in the genus Herina of the family Ulidiidae found in France, Portugal, Spain, Morocco, and Algeria.`
