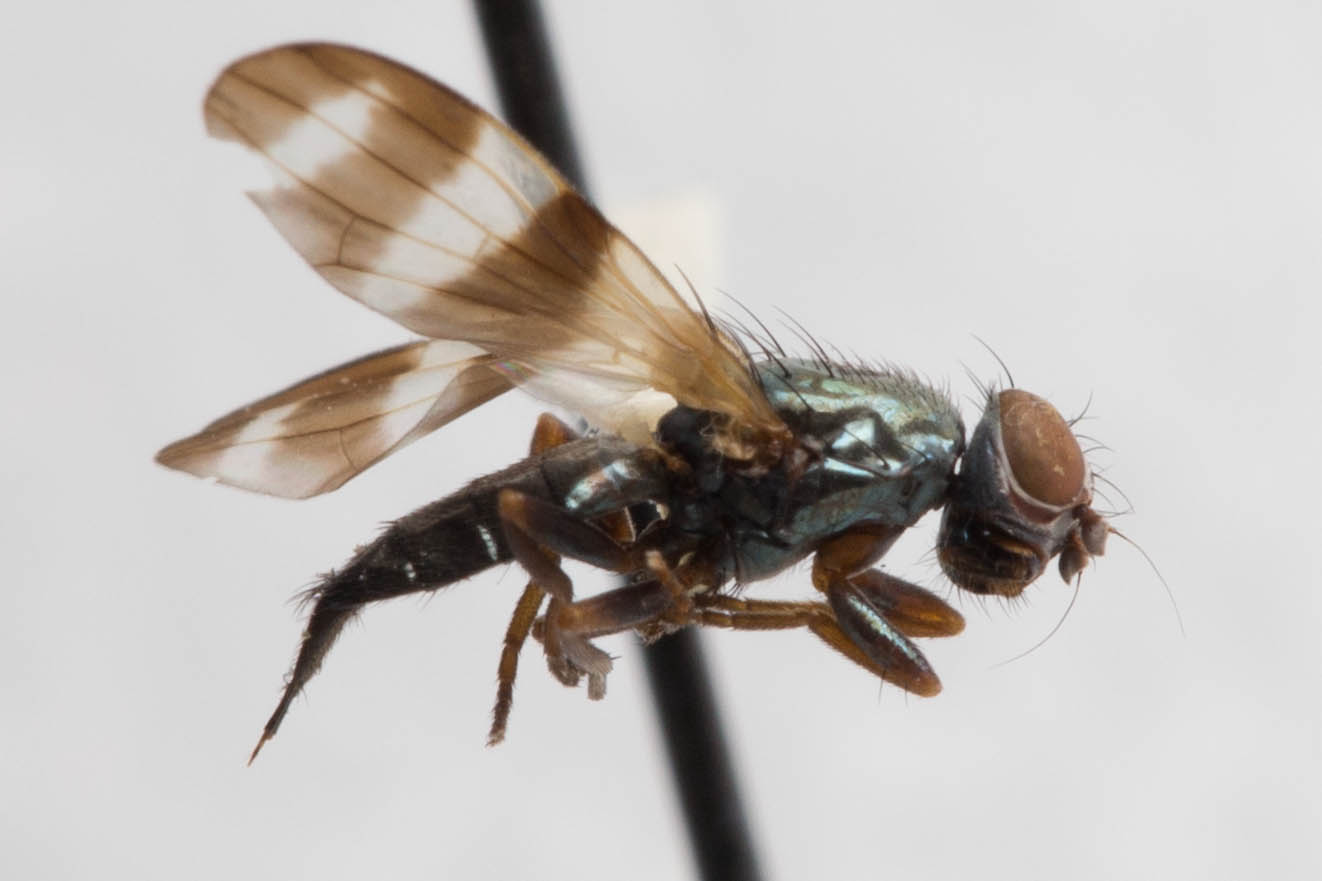

Scientific classification
- Kingdom: Animalia
- Phylum: Arthropoda
- Class: Insecta
- Order: Diptera
- Family: Ulidiidae
- Genus: Chaetopsis
- Species: C. massyla

Binomial name
- Chaetopsis massyla (Walker, 1849)

Synonyms
- Ortalis massyla Walker, 1849

= Chaetopsis massyla =

Species of fly

Chaetopsis massyla is a species of ulidiid or picture-winged fly in the genus Chaetopsis of the family Ulidiidae. It has been recorded from North America.
