= Automola atomaria =

Scientific classification
- Domain: Eukaryota
- Kingdom: Animalia
- Phylum: Arthropoda
- Class: Insecta
- Order: Diptera
- Family: Richardiidae
- Genus: Automola
- Species: A. atomaria

Binomial name
- Automola atomaria (Wiedemann, 1830)

Synonyms
- Ortalis trifasciata Wiedemann, 1830; Ortalis atomaria Wiedemann; Automola leopardina Blanchard, 1938; Platystoma mexicanum Giglio-Tos, 1893

Species of fly

Automola atomaria is a species of fly in the genus Automola of the family Richardiidae. A. atomaria is found in Central America.
