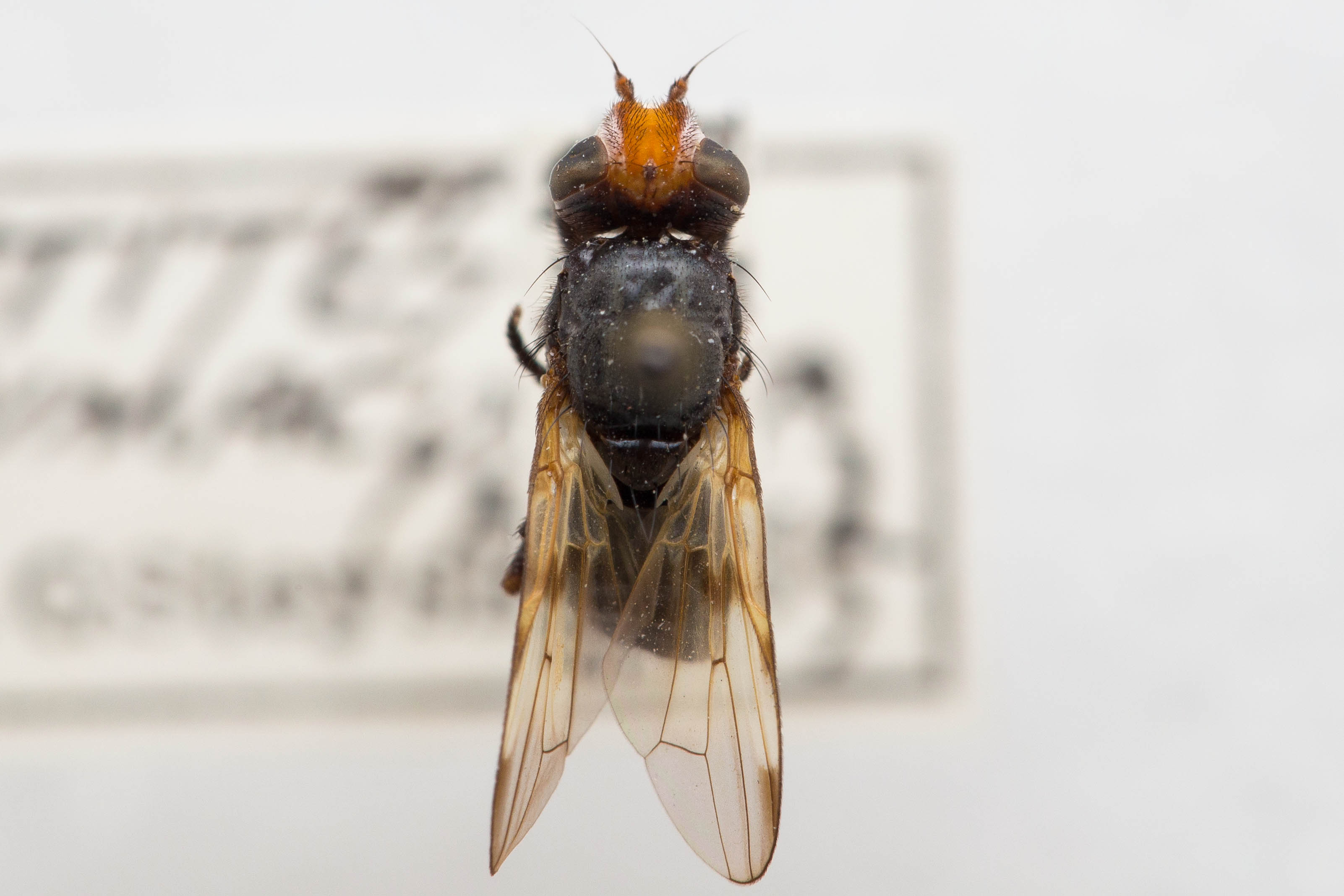

Scientific classification
- Kingdom: Animalia
- Phylum: Arthropoda
- Class: Insecta
- Order: Diptera
- Family: Ulidiidae
- Genus: Otites
- Species: O. bimaculata

Binomial name
- Otites bimaculata (Hendel, 1911)

Synonyms
- Ortalis bimaculata Hendel, 1911; Ortalis longicauda Hendel, 1913; Tetanops carbona Cresson, 1914

= Otites bimaculata =

Species of fly

Otites bimaculata is a species of picture-winged fly in the genus Otites of the family Ulidiidae.
