= Ceroxys laticornis =

Scientific classification
- Kingdom: Animalia
- Phylum: Arthropoda
- Class: Insecta
- Order: Diptera
- Family: Ulidiidae
- Genus: Ceroxys
- Species: C. laticornis

Binomial name
- Ceroxys laticornis (Loew, 1873)

Species of fly

Ceroxys laticornis is a species of ulidiid or picture-winged fly in the genus Ceroxys of the family Ulidiidae.

== Distribution ==
Ceroxys laticornis is found in Russia and northeastern China.
