= Otites grata =

Scientific classification
- Kingdom: Animalia
- Phylum: Arthropoda
- Class: Insecta
- Order: Diptera
- Family: Ulidiidae
- Genus: Otites
- Species: O. grata

Binomial name
- Otites grata (Loew, 1856)

Synonyms
- Ortalis grata Loew, 1856

Species of fly

Otites grata is a species of ulidiid or picture-winged fly in the genus Otites of the family Ulidiidae.
