= Pseudoedaspis striolata =

Scientific classification
- Kingdom: Animalia
- Phylum: Arthropoda
- Class: Insecta
- Order: Diptera
- Family: Tephritidae
- Subfamily: Tephritinae
- Tribe: Tephritini
- Genus: Pseudoedaspis
- Species: P. striolata

Binomial name
- Pseudoedaspis striolata (Blanchard, 1854)

Synonyms
- Ortalis striolata Blanchard, 1854

Species of fly

Pseudoedaspis striolata is a species of tephritid or fruit flies in the genus Pseudoedaspis of the family Tephritidae.

== Distribution ==
Chile.
