= Ceroxys fraudulosa =

Scientific classification
- Kingdom: Animalia
- Phylum: Arthropoda
- Class: Insecta
- Order: Diptera
- Family: Ulidiidae
- Genus: Ceroxys
- Species: C. fraudulosa

Binomial name
- Ceroxys fraudulosa (Loew, 1864)

Synonyms
- Ortalis fraudulosa Loew, 1864; Ceroxys pomariana Rondani, 1869

Species of fly

Ceroxys fraudulosa is a species of picture-winged fly in the genus Ceroxys of the family Ulidiidae.

== Distribution ==
Ceroxys fraudulosa has been recorded in Italy, Bulgaria and Greece.
