= Otites angustata =

Scientific classification
- Kingdom: Animalia
- Phylum: Arthropoda
- Class: Insecta
- Order: Diptera
- Family: Ulidiidae
- Genus: Otites
- Species: O. angustata

Binomial name
- Otites angustata (Loew, 1859)

Synonyms
- Ortalis angustata Loew, 1859

Species of fly

Otites angustata is a species of ulidiid or picture-winged fly in the genus Otites of the family Ulidiidae.
