= Chaetopsis magna =

Scientific classification
- Kingdom: Animalia
- Phylum: Arthropoda
- Class: Insecta
- Order: Diptera
- Family: Ulidiidae
- Genus: Chaetopsis
- Species: C. magna

Binomial name
- Chaetopsis magna Cresson, 1924

Species of fly

Chaetopsis magna is a species of ulidiid or picture-winged fly in the genus Chaetopsis of the family Ulidiidae.
