= Ceroxys confusa =

Scientific classification
- Kingdom: Animalia
- Phylum: Arthropoda
- Class: Insecta
- Order: Diptera
- Family: Ulidiidae
- Genus: Ceroxys
- Species: C. confusa

Binomial name
- Ceroxys confusa (Becker, 1912)

Synonyms
- Ortalis confusa Becker, 1912

Species of fly

Ceroxys confusa is a species of ulidiid or picture-winged fly in the genus Ceroxys of the family Ulidiidae.

== Distribution ==
C. confusa has been recorded in Iran, and in the Arabian Peninsula.
