= Otites dominula =

Scientific classification
- Kingdom: Animalia
- Phylum: Arthropoda
- Class: Insecta
- Order: Diptera
- Family: Ulidiidae
- Genus: Otites
- Species: O. dominula

Binomial name
- Otites dominula (Loew, 1868)

Synonyms
- Ortalis dominula Loew, 1868

Species of fly

Otites dominula is a species of ulidiid or picture-winged fly in the genus Otites of the family Ulidiidae.
