= Otites erythrocephala =

Scientific classification
- Kingdom: Animalia
- Phylum: Arthropoda
- Class: Insecta
- Order: Diptera
- Family: Ulidiidae
- Genus: Otites
- Species: O. erythrocephala

Binomial name
- Otites erythrocephala (Hendel, 1911)

Synonyms
- Ortalis erythrocephala Hendel, 1911

Species of fly

Otites erythrocephala is a species of picture-winged fly in the genus Otites of the family Ulidiidae.
