= Euxesta sororcula =

Scientific classification
- Domain: Eukaryota
- Kingdom: Animalia
- Phylum: Arthropoda
- Class: Insecta
- Order: Diptera
- Family: Ulidiidae
- Genus: Euxesta
- Species: E. sororcula

Binomial name
- Euxesta sororcula (Wiedemann, 1830)

Synonyms
- Ortalis sororcula Wiedemann, 1830

Species of fly

Euxesta sororcula is a species of ulidiid or picture-winged fly in the genus Euxesta of the family Ulidiidae. Its distribution is in Central and South America. It feeds on foliage of the genus Zea.
