= Herina parva =

Scientific classification
- Kingdom: Animalia
- Phylum: Arthropoda
- Class: Insecta
- Order: Diptera
- Family: Ulidiidae
- Genus: Herina
- Species: H. parva

Binomial name
- Herina parva (Loew, 1864)

Synonyms
- Ortalis parva Loew, 1864

Species of fly

Herina parva is a species of picture-winged fly in the genus Herina of the family Ulidiidae found in Austria, France, Germany, and Spain.
