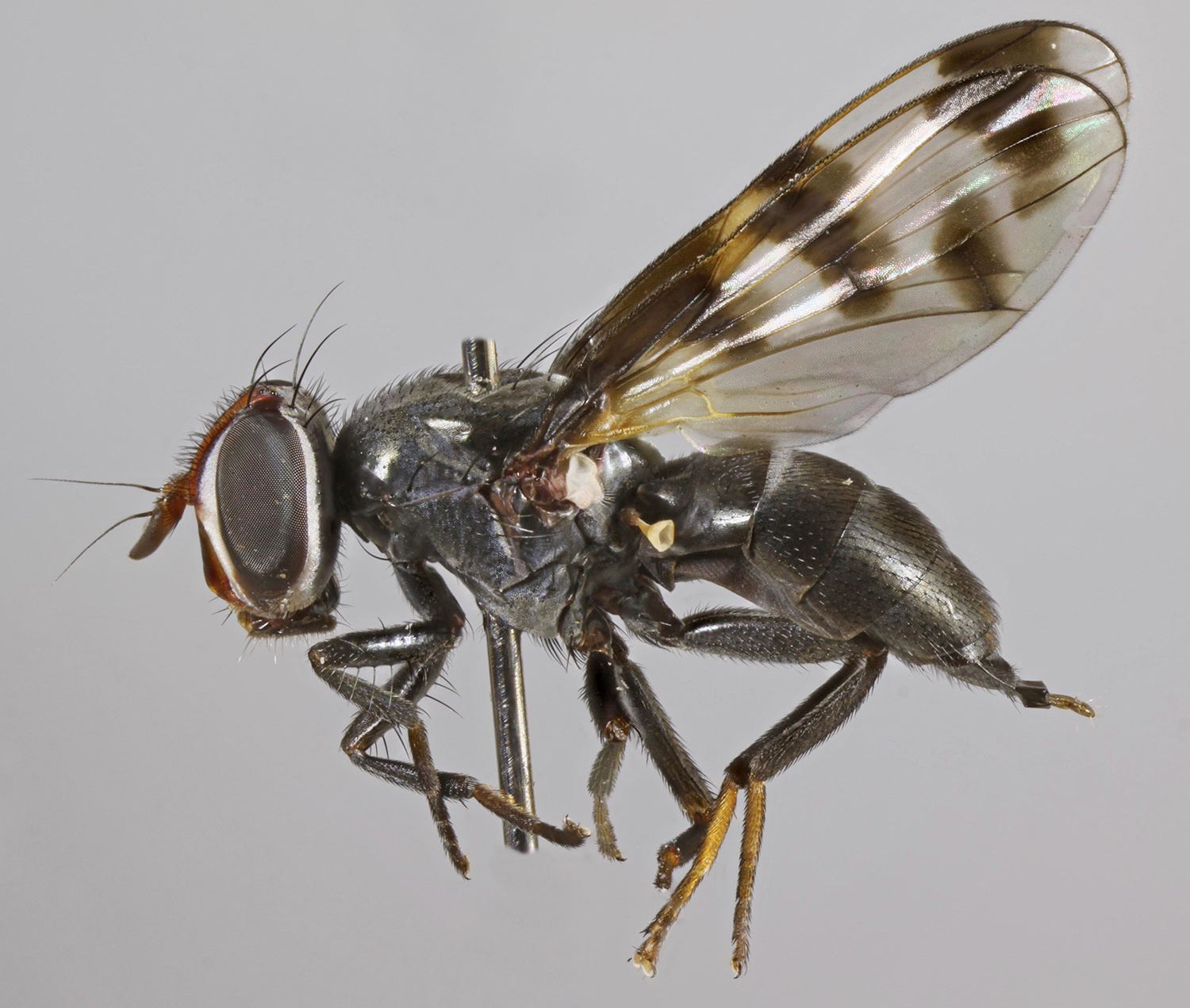
- Herina lugubris North Wales

Scientific classification
- Kingdom: Animalia
- Phylum: Arthropoda
- Class: Insecta
- Order: Diptera
- Family: Ulidiidae
- Genus: Herina
- Species: H. lugubris

Binomial name
- Herina lugubris (Meigen, 1826)

Synonyms
- Ortalis lugubris Meigen, 1826; Ortalis afflicta Meigen, 1830; Herina longistylata Rivosecchi, 1992

= Herina lugubris =

Species of fly

Herina lugubris is a species of picture-winged fly in the genus Herina of the family Ulidiidae found in France, Portugal, Spain, Italy, England and Ireland.
