= Trapherinae =

Scientific classification
- Domain: Eukaryota
- Kingdom: Animalia
- Phylum: Arthropoda
- Class: Insecta
- Order: Diptera
- Family: Platystomatidae
- Subfamily: Trapherinae; Hendel, 1914

Subfamily of flies

Trapherinae is a subfamily of flies (Diptera) in the family Platystomatidae (Signal flies), which currently includes 11 genera.

== Subfamily classification ==
The Platystomatidae were comprehensively divided into five subfamilies, but more recent reviews of morphology suggest that some aspects of this classification are unsatisfactory. This led to reducing the number of subfamilies to four, being the Plastotephritinae, Platystomatinae, Trapherinae and Trapherinae - Angitulinae being subsumed into Platystomatinae.

Nonetheless, definition of the subfamily Trapherinae is still open to debate and requires phylogenetic confirmation. At present, genera assigned to the subfamily are considered as having the following subset of characters: distiphallus terminating in terminal filaments, but no glans, tergites 4 and 5 unreduced in female and tergite 6 in the female abdomen well developed. Although McAlpine rejected the use of the presence of an anepisternal (=sternopleural) seta, Whittington more recently continued to use it as it provides an additional character besides those given above, all of which are transitional to some extent in the other subfamilies of the Platystomatidae. In particular, head and genitalic morphology, and perhaps larval biology once more of this is known, should play a role in the definition of the subfamilies, the debate for which remains open.

Seven of the eleven genera in the Trapherinae are monotypic: Aglaioptera, Eopiara, Phasiamya, Phlyax, Piara, Traphera and Xiriella.

== Biology ==
Little is known of the biology of Trapherinae. Larvae of Poecilotraphera were recorded from guava, sugar cane, rice and maize. and adults have been observed on the under surface of leaves.

== Biogeography ==
Without doubt, the largest concentration of species of Trapherinae occurs in the Oriental region. The subfamily is entirely absent from the Americas and the Palaearctic and by only one genus (Phlyax) in Australasia. There are four genera known from the Afrotropical region, only one of which also occurs in the Oriental region (Lule).

== Genera ==
- Aglaioptera Frey, 1964
- Eopiara Frey, 1964
- Lule Speiser, 1910
- Phasiamya Walker, 1849
- Piara Loew, 1873
- Phlyax McAlpine, 2001
- Poecilotraphera Hendel, 1914
- Seguyopiara Steyskal, 1990
- Traphera Loew, 1873
- Xiria Walker, 1856
- Xiriella Frey, 1964
