= Eumecosomyia nubila =

Scientific classification
- Domain: Eukaryota
- Kingdom: Animalia
- Phylum: Arthropoda
- Class: Insecta
- Order: Diptera
- Family: Ulidiidae
- Genus: Eumecosomyia
- Species: E. nubila

Binomial name
- Eumecosomyia nubila (Wiedemann, 1830)

Synonyms
- Ortalis nubila Wiedemann, 1830; Epiplatea gracilis Coquillett, 1900

Species of fly

Eumecosomyia nubila is a species of ulidiid or picture-winged fly in the genus Eumecosomyia of the family Ulidiidae. Its distribution includes parts of the United States, islands in the Caribbean, Central America, and South America.
