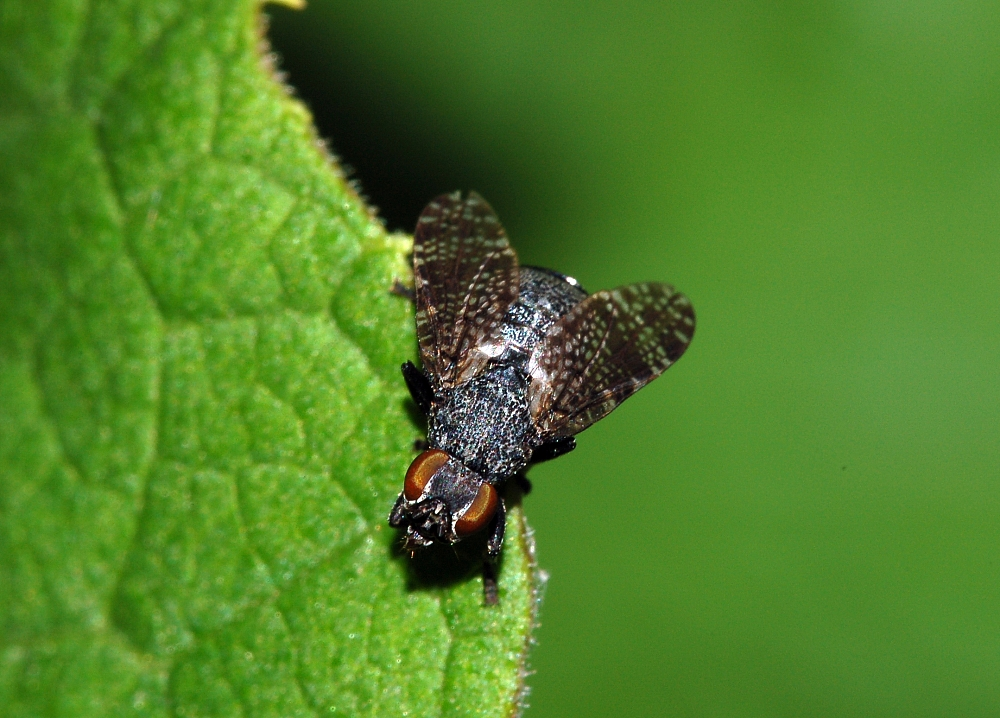
- Platystoma seminationis

Scientific classification
- Domain: Eukaryota
- Kingdom: Animalia
- Phylum: Arthropoda
- Class: Insecta
- Order: Diptera
- Superfamily: Tephritoidea
- Family: Platystomatidae; Schiner, 1862

Subfamilies
- Plastotephritinae; Platystomatinae; Scholastinae; Trapherinae

= Platystomatidae =

Family of flies

Strange courtship behaviour of the European signal fly Platystoma seminationis (video, 7m 19s)

The Platystomatidae (signal flies) are a distinctive family of flies (Diptera) in the superfamily Tephritoidea.

Signal flies are worldwide in distribution, found in all the biogeographic realms, but predominantly in the tropics. It is one of several families of acalyptrate Diptera with over 1000 species, comprising around 1200 species in 127 genera.

== Biology ==
Adults are found on tree trunks and foliage and are attracted to flowers, decaying fruit, excrement, sweat, and decomposing snails. Larvae are found on fresh and decaying vegetation, carrion, human corpses, and root nodules, particularly in the genus Rivellia, which has economic implications for legume crops. Larvae from the remaining genera are either phytophagous (eating plant material) or saprophagous (eating decomposing organic matter). Some are predatory on other insects and others have been found in human lesions, while others are of minor agricultural significance.

== Family description ==
For terms see Morphology of Diptera
Signal flies are very variable in external appearance, ranging from small (2.5 mm), slender species to large (20 mm), robust individuals, often with body colours having a distinctive metallic lustre and with face and wings usually patterned with dark spots or bands. The head is large. Frontal bristles on head are absent. Two orbital bristles are on the head. The frontal stripe is pubescent and the arista is more or less long and pubescent. The antennal grooves are deep and divided by a median keel. Radial vein 4+5 bears bristles. The costa is without interruptions and the anal cell is elongated, bordered on outer side by an arcuate or straight vein. The abdomen of male has five visible segments and the female has six.

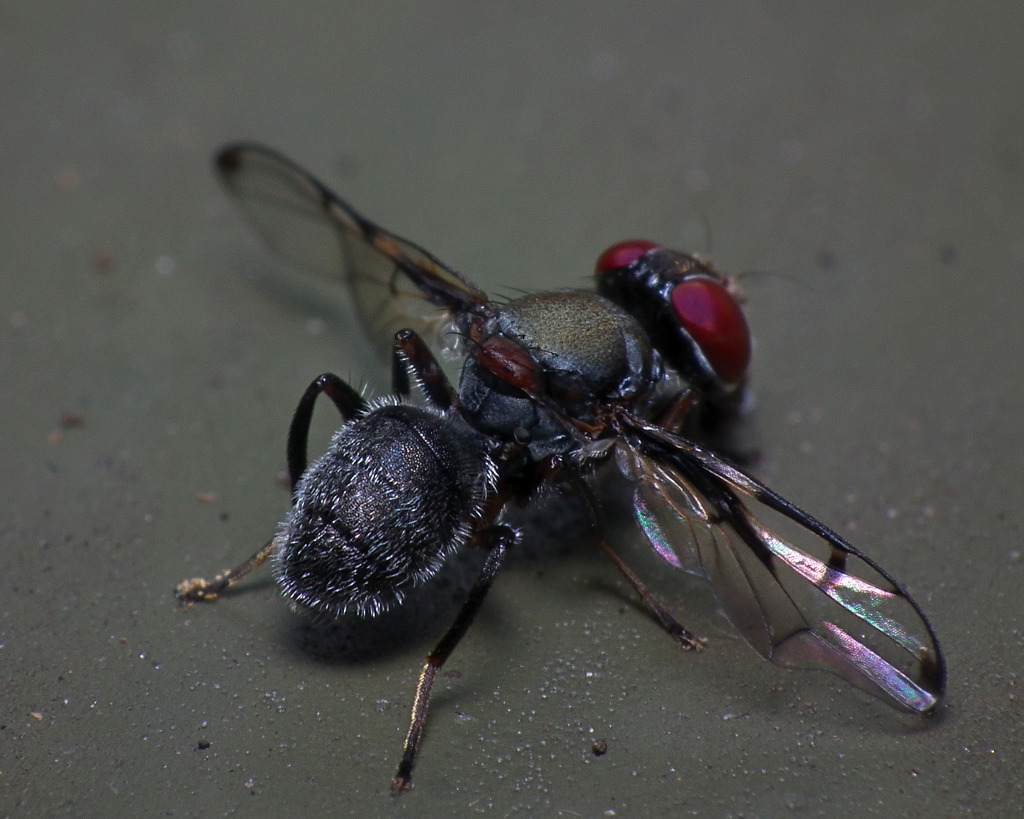
Pogonortalis doclea

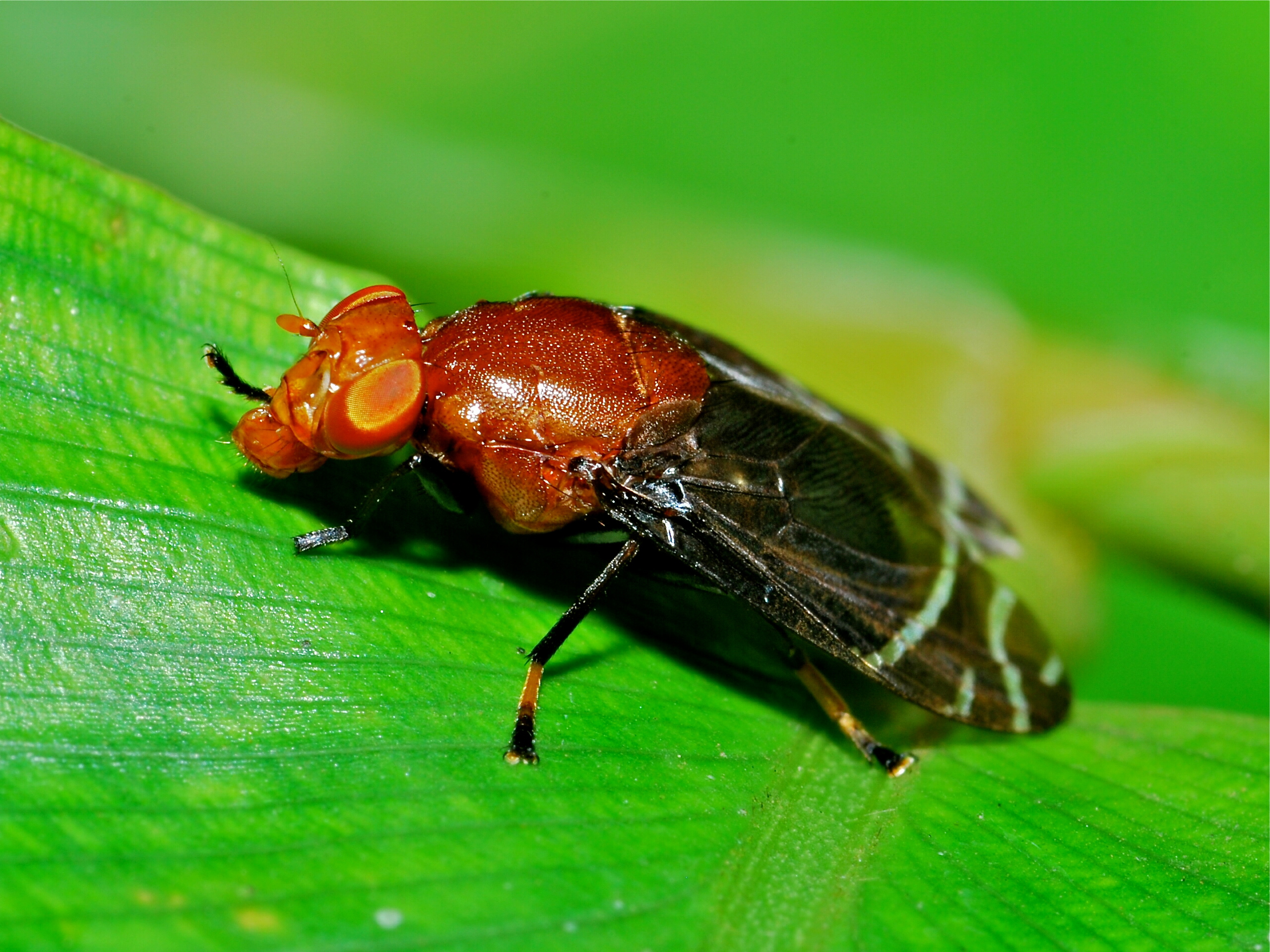
Peltacanthina sp.

Many bizarre forms of morphology and behaviour occur in this family. Heads and legs (fore legs especially) may be oddly shaped, extended in various ways or with adornments, all of which serve to supplement agonistic behaviour. Such behaviour underlies social and sexual interaction between individuals of the same species of signal flies, first researched in Australian species of the genera Euprosopia (image) and Pogonortalis.

In males of Pogonortalis, the length and degree of development of hairs (setae) on the lower facial area, together with widening of the head, facilitates territorial dominance by head-butting and rearing-up behaviours. Head-butting is taken to the extreme in the Australasian genus Achias, in which species have the fronto-orbital plates expanded laterally to produce eyestalks.

Development of body structures is prevalent in the Afrotropical and Oriental subfamily Plastotephritinae, including 9 different types of modification in 16 genera.

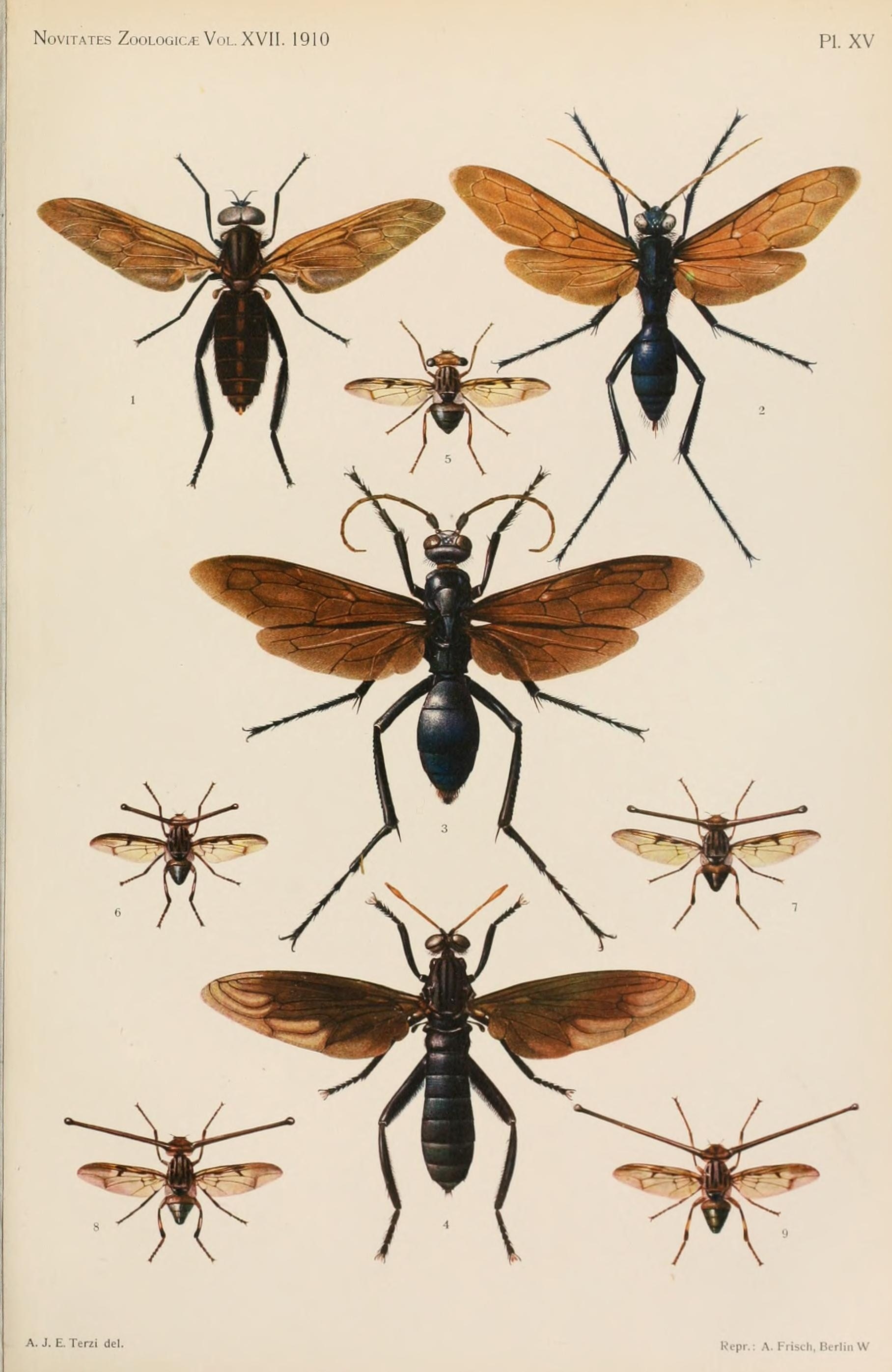
Plate from Novitates Zoologicae showing the great variation in eyestalk development in Achias rothschildi

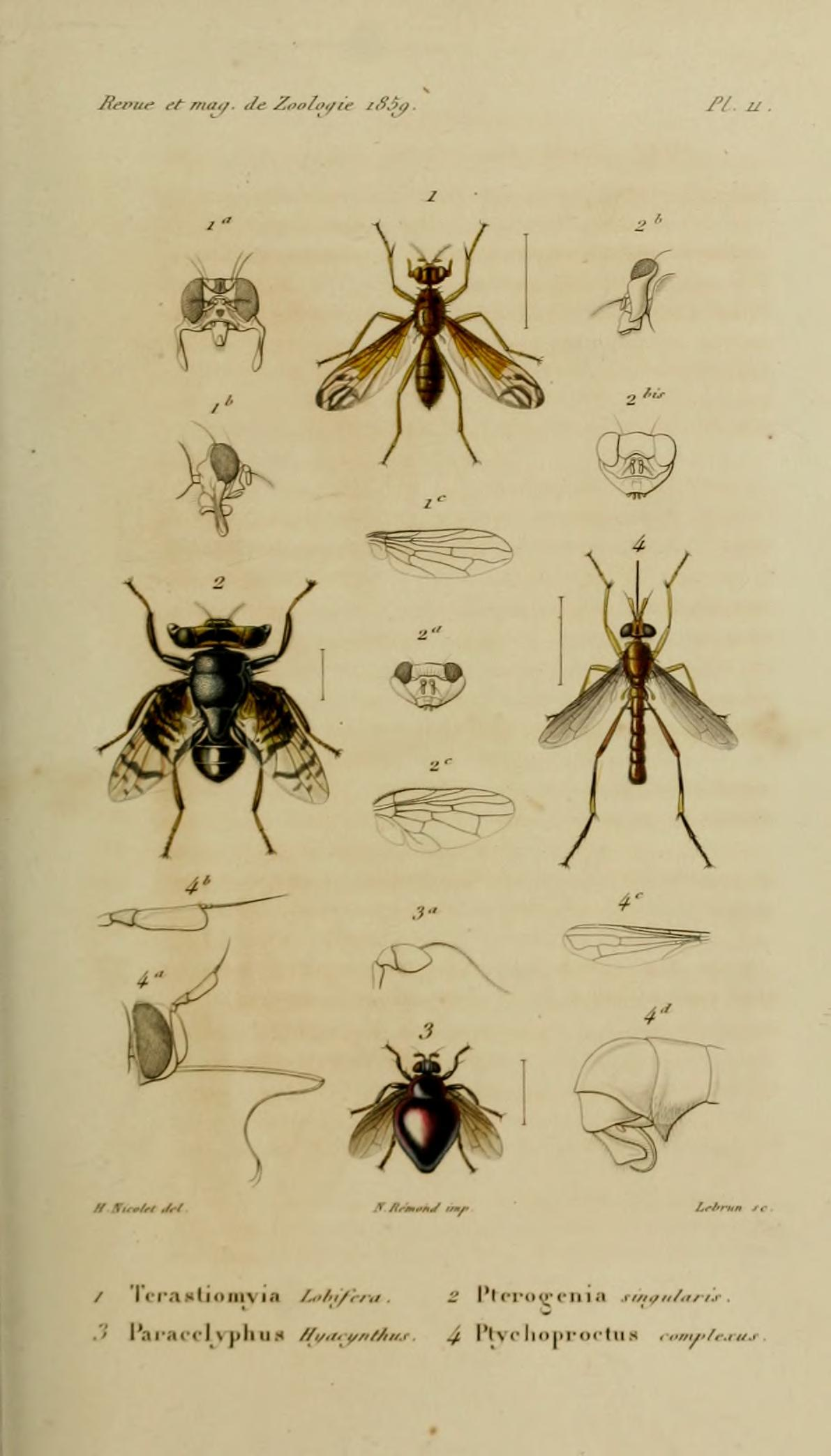
Plate from Revue et Magasin de Zoologie depicting Pterogenia singularis Bigot, 1859

Some species have prominent eyestalks also found in the family Diopsidae. In the Diopsidae, eyestalks develop through lateral development of the frontal plate, with the result that the antennae are situated on the stalk near the compound eye. The process of development in signal flies is different in that the fronto-orbital plates expanded laterally to produce eyestalks and consequently the antennae remain in a central position. This is an example of convergent evolution. The development of eyestalks reaches its extreme in the platystomatid species Achias rothschildi Austen, 1910 from New Guinea, pictured here in which males have an eye-span up to 55 mm.

Families of acalyptrate flies exhibiting morphological development associated with agonistic behaviour include: Clusiidae, Diopsidae, Drosophilidae, Platystomatidae, Tephritidae, and Ulidiidae.

See also

== Biogeography ==
The largest concentration of Platystomatidae undoubtedly occurs in the Australasian region, followed closely by the Afrotropical region. The number of genera and species in the Oriental, European, Nearctic and Neotropical faunas are much more restricted and are summarised in the Regional Catalogues.

Some genera are widely distributed over more than one region. For example, Plagiostenopterina Hendel, 1912, is widely distributed in the Old World tropics (Australasian, Oriental and Afrotropical regions) and Rivellia Robineau-Desvoidy, 1830 is almost cosmopolitan, although numbers of species in Europe are very restricted in number. Taxonomic revisions of such genera need to examine the wider implications of these broad distributions. Other genera are known from just a single location. Bama McAlpine, 2001, for example, is known only from New Guinea.

== Taxonomic history ==
As is the case with the taxonomy many flies, the first described species of Platystomatidae were placed in the large family Muscidae, because in the 19th century, the Muscidae formed a portmanteau group for the higher Diptera. It was only after many species were accumulated into larger collections and numerous names proposed, that taxonomists began to realise that the Diptera consisted of several distinct families.

The oldest family-group name for the Platystomatidae is in fact Achiasidae Fleming, 1821, based on the genus Achias Fabricius, 1805. There has, however, been an overwhelming predominance of the usage of names based on the genus Platystoma Meigen, 1803. After petition by Steyskal & McAlpine (1974), the International Commission on Zoological Nomenclature (1979) ruled under plenary power that family-group names based on Achias should be suppressed, giving those based on Platystoma precedence.

Initially, subfamilies within the Muscidae were recognised; the early Platystomatidae belonging to the Ortalides, but toward the end of the 19th century, many of these subfamilies were raised to family status, at which point the Ortalides became the Ortalidae. The name Otitidae became a replacement name for Ortalides, until Hendel's significant contribution and re-organisation of the genera of the World firmly placed the Platystomatidae as a subfamily of Muscaridae, divided into several tribes. Furthermore, he recognised the broad divisions Acalyptrae and Calyptrae, placing Platystomatinae correctly in the former. Enderlein, who proposed more new plastotephritine (subfamily) names than Hendel, still preferred Ortalidae to Muscaridae, but adopted the Platystomatinae subfamily status that Hendel had proposed.

== See also ==
- List of Platystomatidae genera
