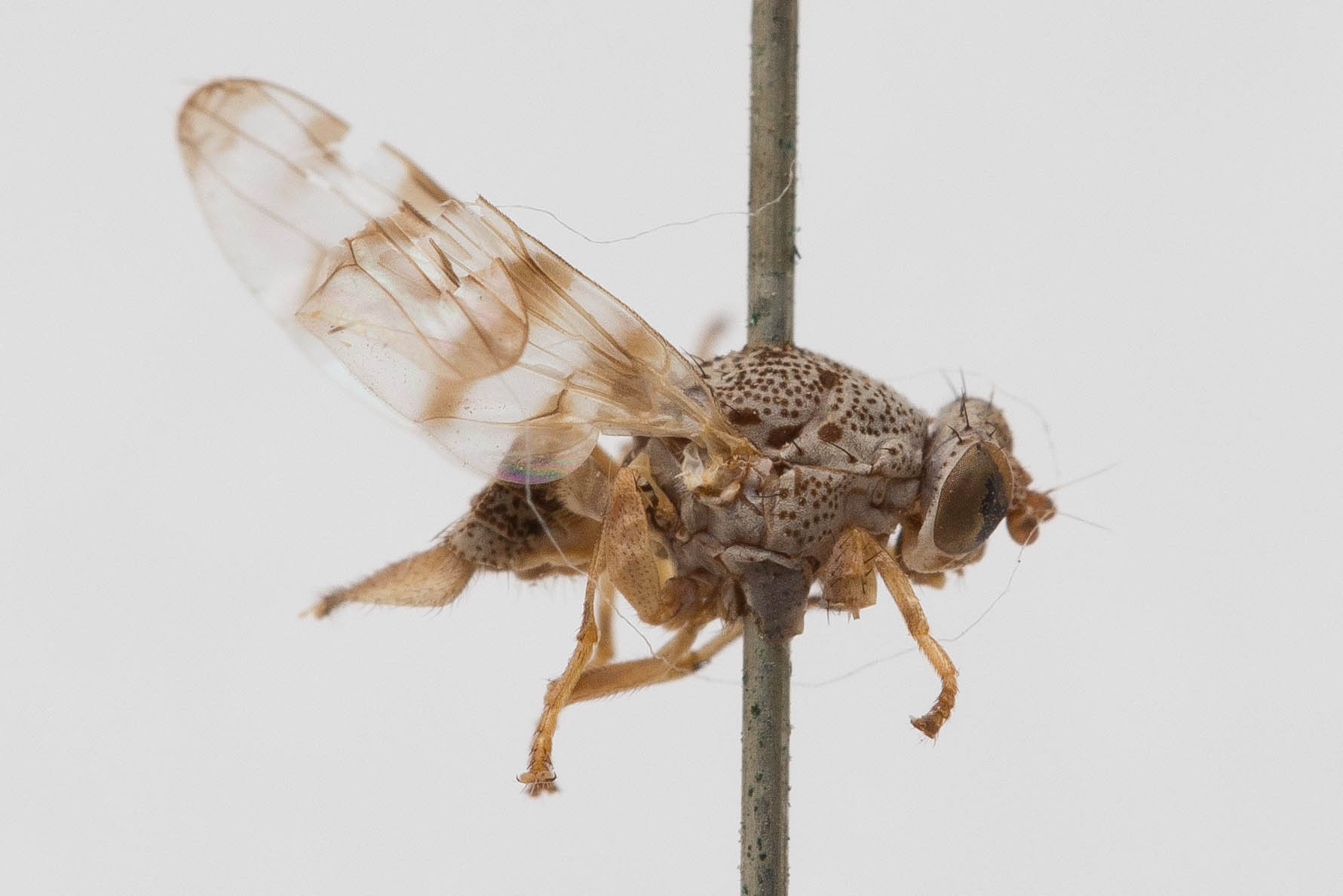

Scientific classification
- Kingdom: Animalia
- Phylum: Arthropoda
- Class: Insecta
- Order: Diptera
- Family: Ulidiidae
- Subfamily: Otitinae
- Tribe: Myennidini
- Genus: Pseudotephritina
- Species: P. cribellum

Binomial name
- Pseudotephritina cribellum (Loew, 1873)

Synonyms
- Stictocephala cribellum Loew, 1873; Stictocephala cribrum Loew, 1873

= Pseudotephritina cribellum =

Species of fly

Pseudotephritina cribellum is a species of ulidiid or picture-winged fly in the genus Myennis of the family Ulidiidae.

== Distribution ==
United States.
