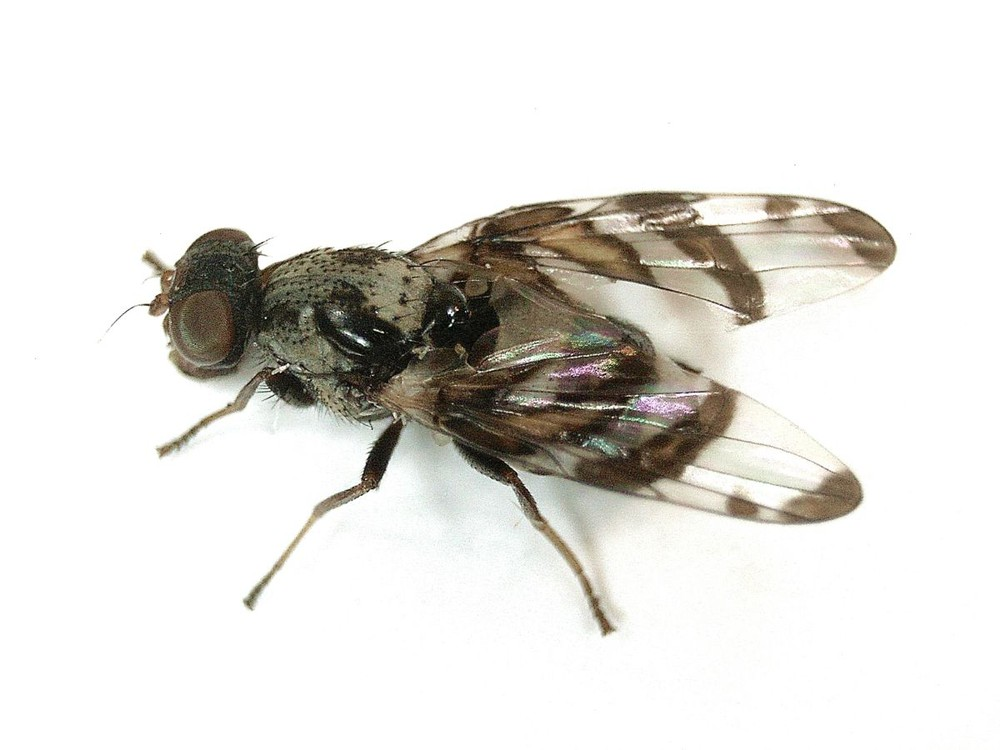

Scientific classification
- Kingdom: Animalia
- Phylum: Arthropoda
- Class: Insecta
- Order: Diptera
- Family: Ulidiidae
- Subfamily: Otitinae
- Tribe: Myennidini
- Genus: Myennis
- Species: M. octopunctata

Binomial name
- Myennis octopunctata (Coquebert, 1798)

Synonyms
- Myennis fasciata (Fabricius, 1805); Musca octopunctata Coquebert, 1798; Scatophaga fasciata Fabricius, 1805

= Myennis octopunctata =

Species of fly

Myennis octopunctata is a species of picture-winged fly in the genus Myennis of the family Ulidiidae.

== Distribution ==
Most of Central and Northern Europe.
