= Pseudodyscrasis scutellaris =

Scientific classification
- Kingdom: Animalia
- Phylum: Arthropoda
- Class: Insecta
- Order: Diptera
- Family: Ulidiidae
- Subfamily: Otitinae
- Tribe: Myennidini
- Genus: Pseudodyscrasis
- Species: P. scutellaris

Binomial name
- Pseudodyscrasis scutellaris (Wiedemann, 1830)

Synonyms
- Trypeta scutellaris Wiedemann, 1830

Species of fly

Pseudodyscrasis scutellaris is a species of ulidiid or picture-winged fly in the genus Myennis of the family Ulidiidae.

== Distribution ==
Mexico.
