= Pseudotephritis ussurica =

Scientific classification
- Kingdom: Animalia
- Phylum: Arthropoda
- Class: Insecta
- Order: Diptera
- Family: Ulidiidae
- Subfamily: Otitinae
- Tribe: Myennidini
- Genus: Pseudotephritis
- Species: P. ussurica

Binomial name
- Pseudotephritis ussurica Krivosheina & Krivosheina, 1997

Synonyms
- Pseudotephritis ussuruca Krivosheina & Krivosheina, 1997

Species of fly

Pseudotephritis ussurica is a species of ulidiid or picture-winged fly in the genus Pseudotephritis of the family Ulidiidae.

== Distribution ==
Russian Far East.
