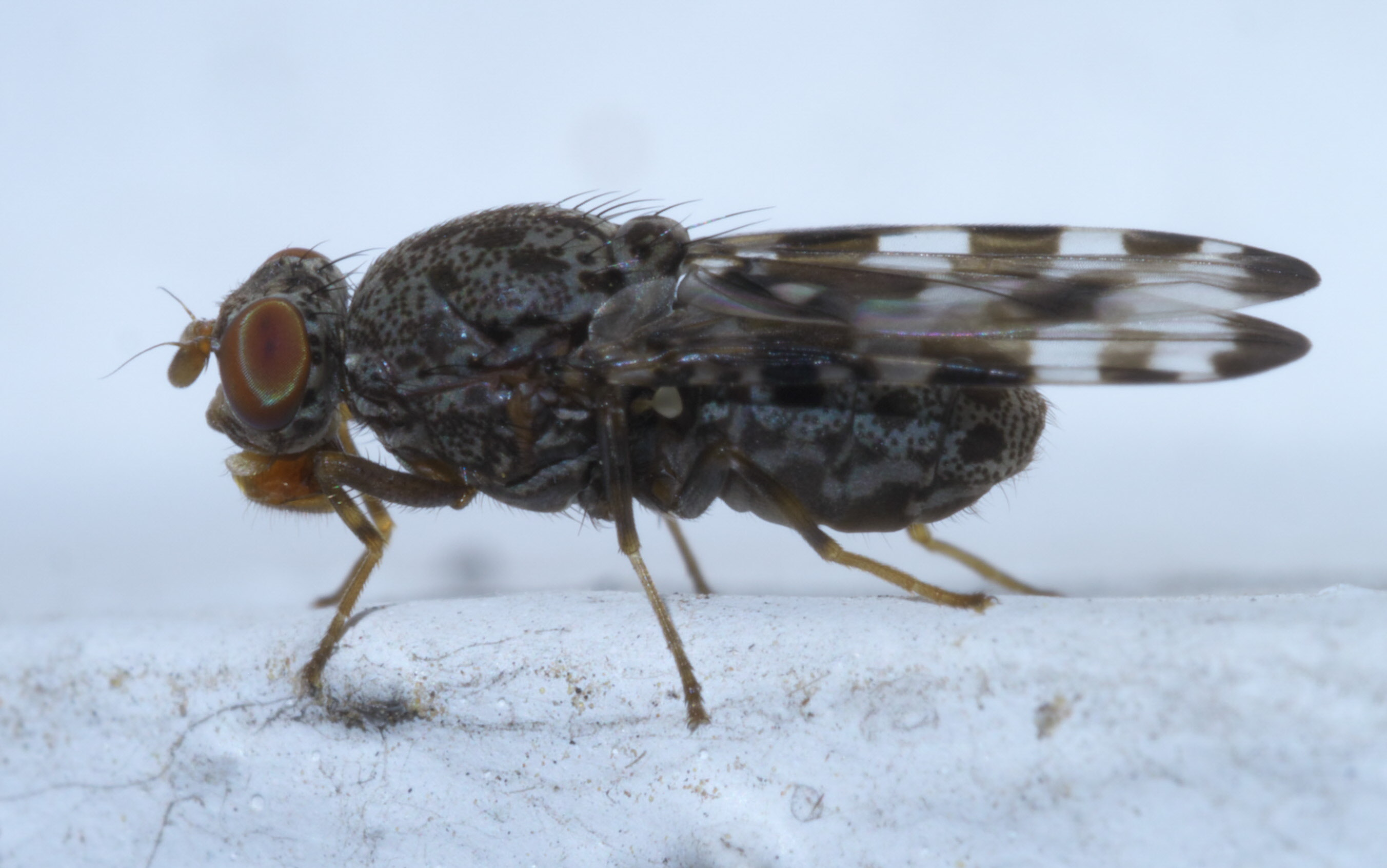

Scientific classification
- Kingdom: Animalia
- Phylum: Arthropoda
- Class: Insecta
- Order: Diptera
- Family: Ulidiidae
- Subfamily: Otitinae
- Tribe: Myennidini
- Genus: Pseudotephritis
- Species: P. approximata

Binomial name
- Pseudotephritis approximata Banks, 1914

= Pseudotephritis approximata =

Species of fly

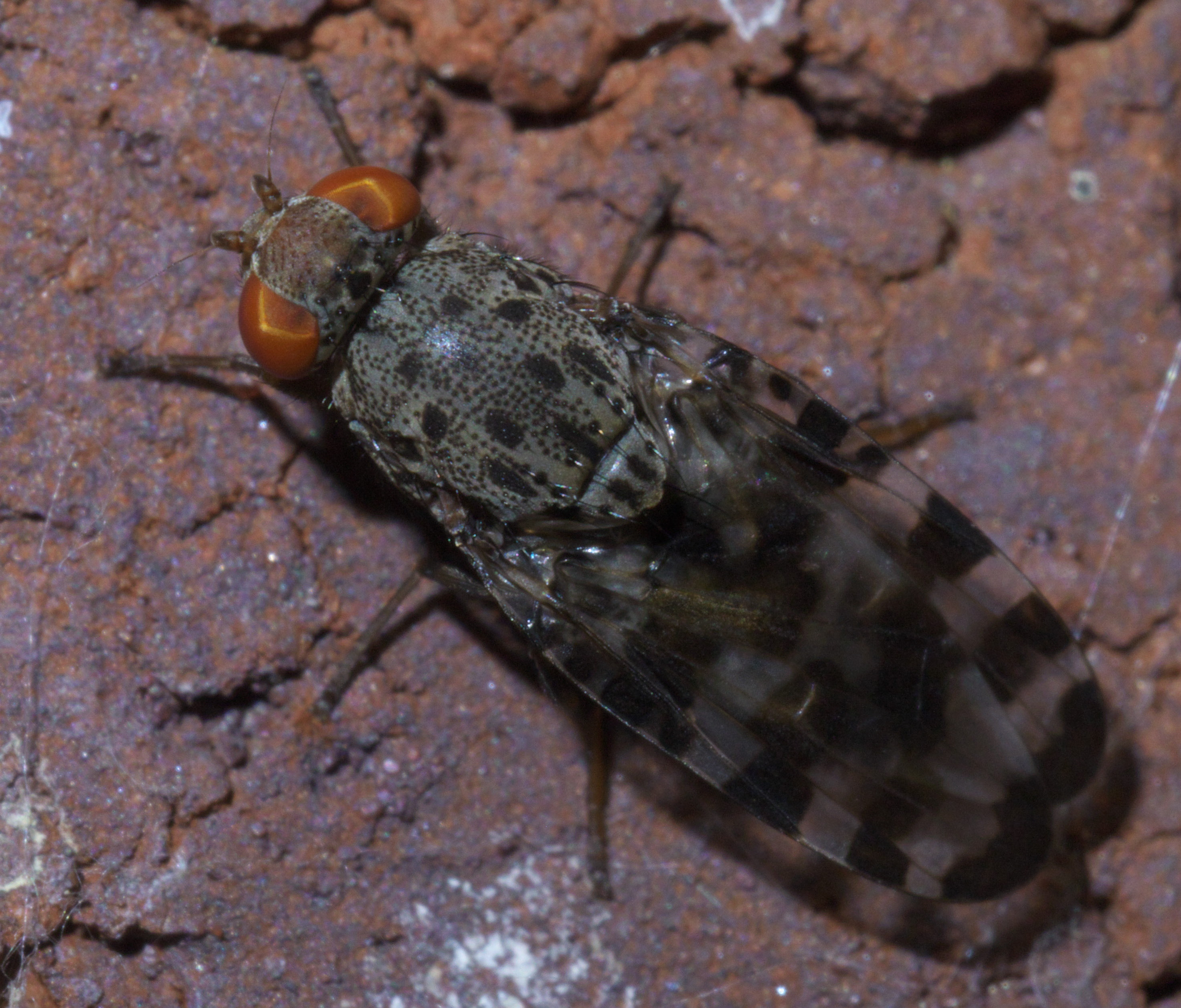
Pseudotephritis approximata

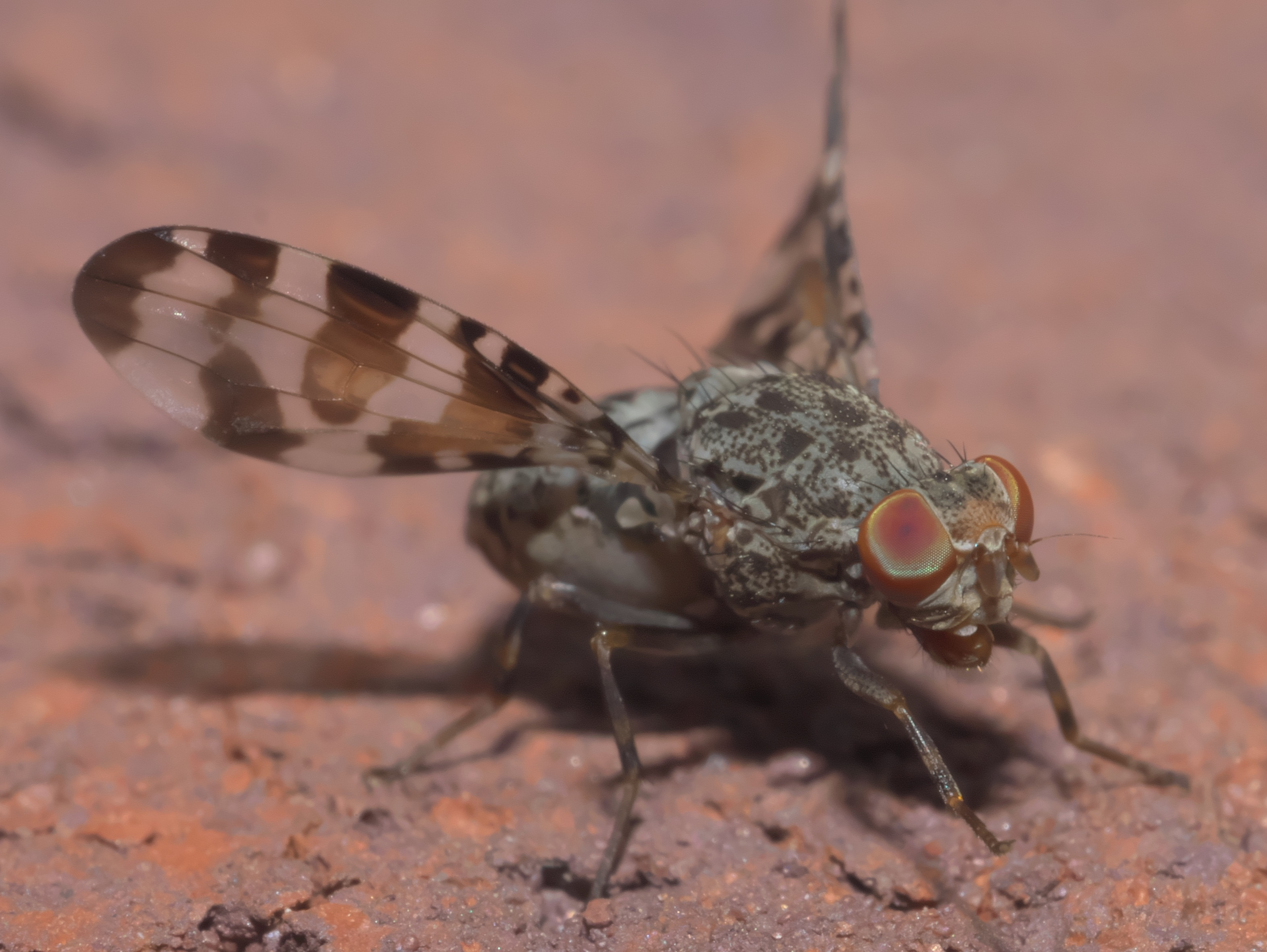
Pseudotephritis approximata

Pseudotephritis approximata is a species of ulidiid or picture-winged fly in the genus Pseudotephritis of the family Ulidiidae.

Pseudotephritis approximata ovipositing into a log

Approximate distribution of Pseudotephritis approximata in the United States. States where the fly is found are shown in purple.

== Distribution ==
Pseudotephritis approximata is found in the United States (Iowa, Michigan, Pennsylvania, and south to Mississippi and Virginia).
