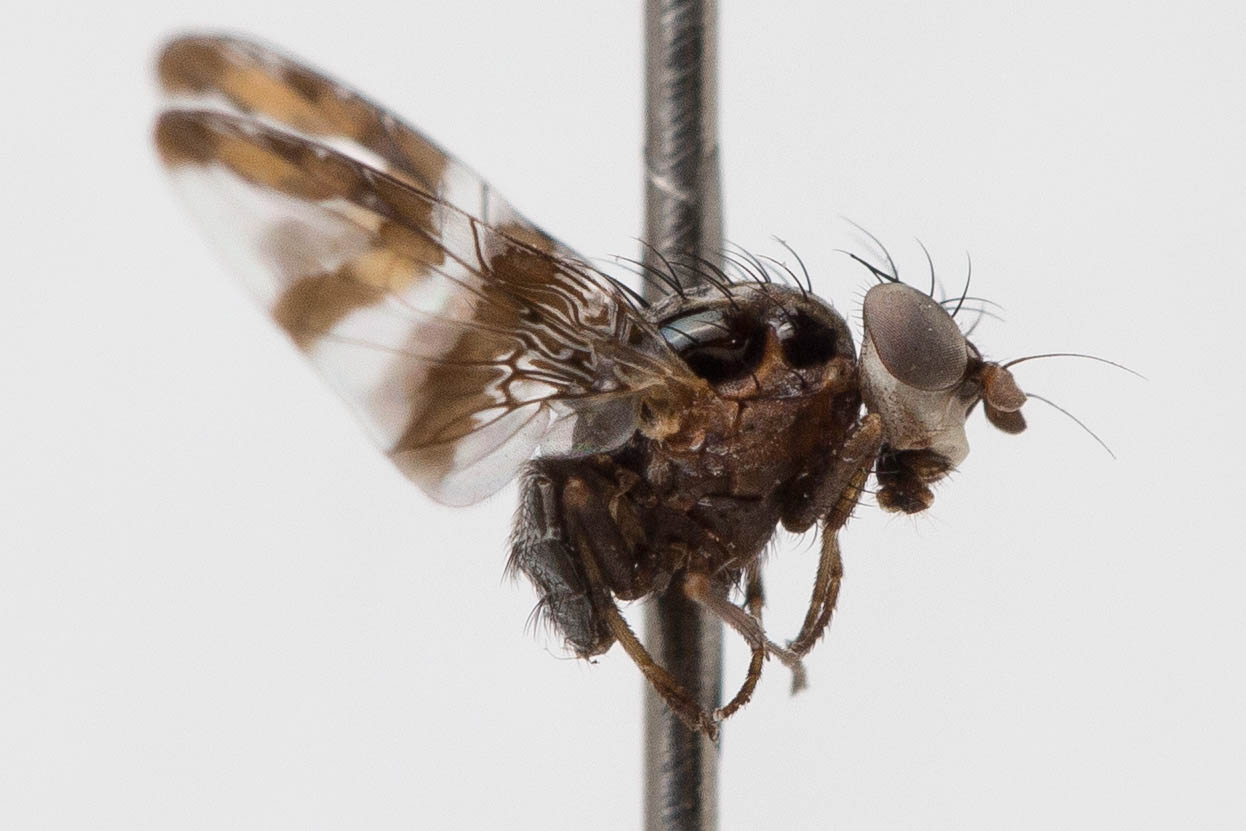

Scientific classification
- Kingdom: Animalia
- Phylum: Arthropoda
- Class: Insecta
- Order: Diptera
- Family: Ulidiidae
- Subfamily: Otitinae
- Tribe: Myennidini
- Genus: Dyscrasis
- Species: D. hendeli

Binomial name
- Dyscrasis hendeli Aldrich, 1932

= Dyscrasis hendeli =

Species of fly

Dyscrasis hendeli is a species of picture-winged fly in the family Ulidiidae.

== Distribution ==
Mexico, United States.
