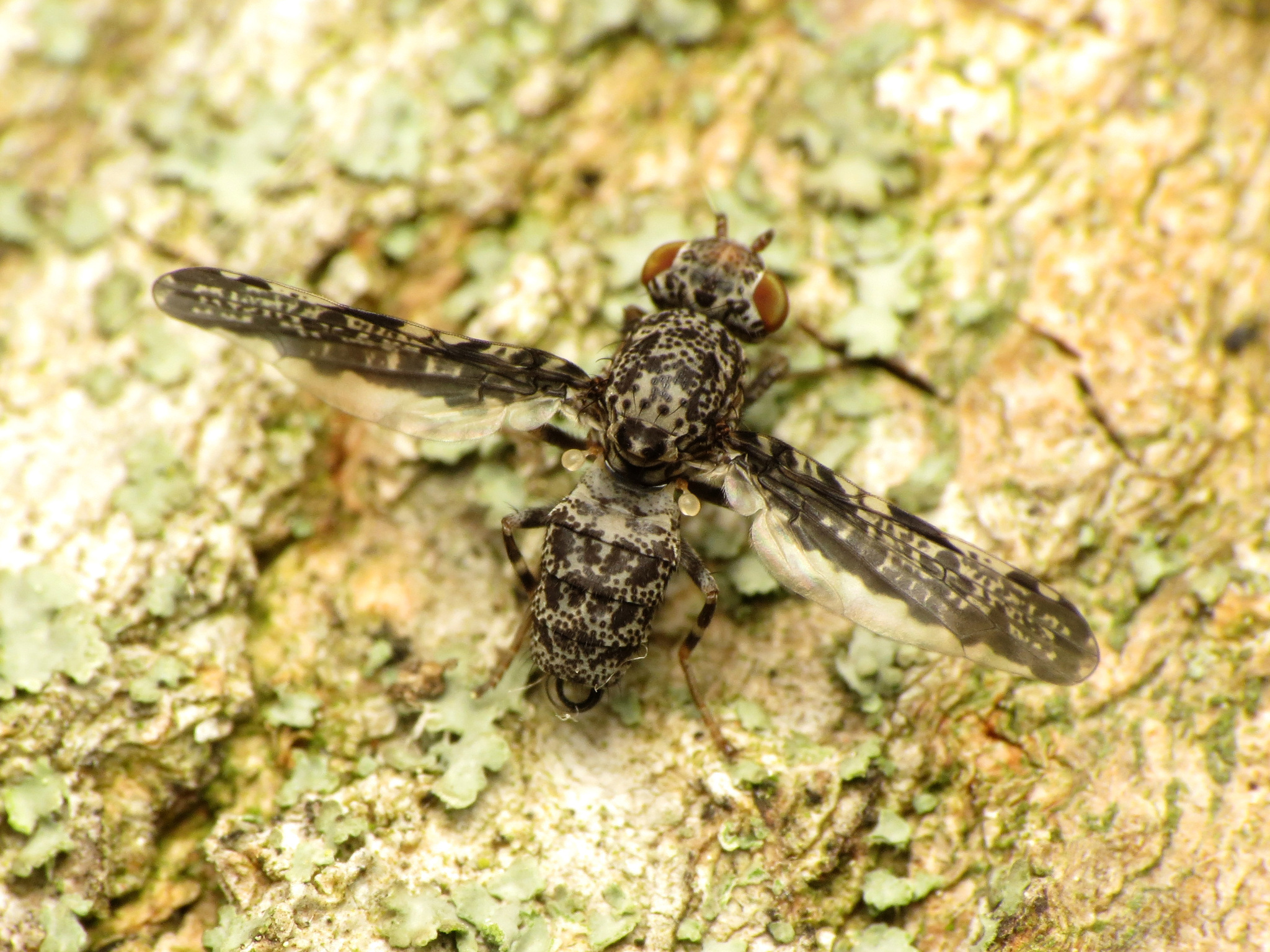

Scientific classification
- Kingdom: Animalia
- Phylum: Arthropoda
- Class: Insecta
- Order: Diptera
- Family: Ulidiidae
- Subfamily: Otitinae
- Tribe: Myennidini
- Genus: Callopistromyia
- Species: C. strigula

Binomial name
- Callopistromyia strigula (Loew, 1873)

Synonyms
- Pterocalla strigula Loew, 1873

= Callopistromyia strigula =

Species of fly

Callopistromyia strigula is a species of picture-winged fly in the family Ulidiidae.

== Distribution ==
Canada, United States.
