= Arborotites stuckenbergi =

Scientific classification
- Kingdom: Animalia
- Phylum: Arthropoda
- Class: Insecta
- Order: Diptera
- Family: Ulidiidae
- Subfamily: Otitinae
- Tribe: Myennidini
- Genus: Arborotites
- Species: A. stuckenbergi

Binomial name
- Arborotites stuckenbergi Barraclough, 2000

Species of fly

Arborotites stuckenbergi is a species of ulidiid or picture-winged fly in the genus Arborotites of the family Ulidiidae.

== Distribution ==
South Africa.
