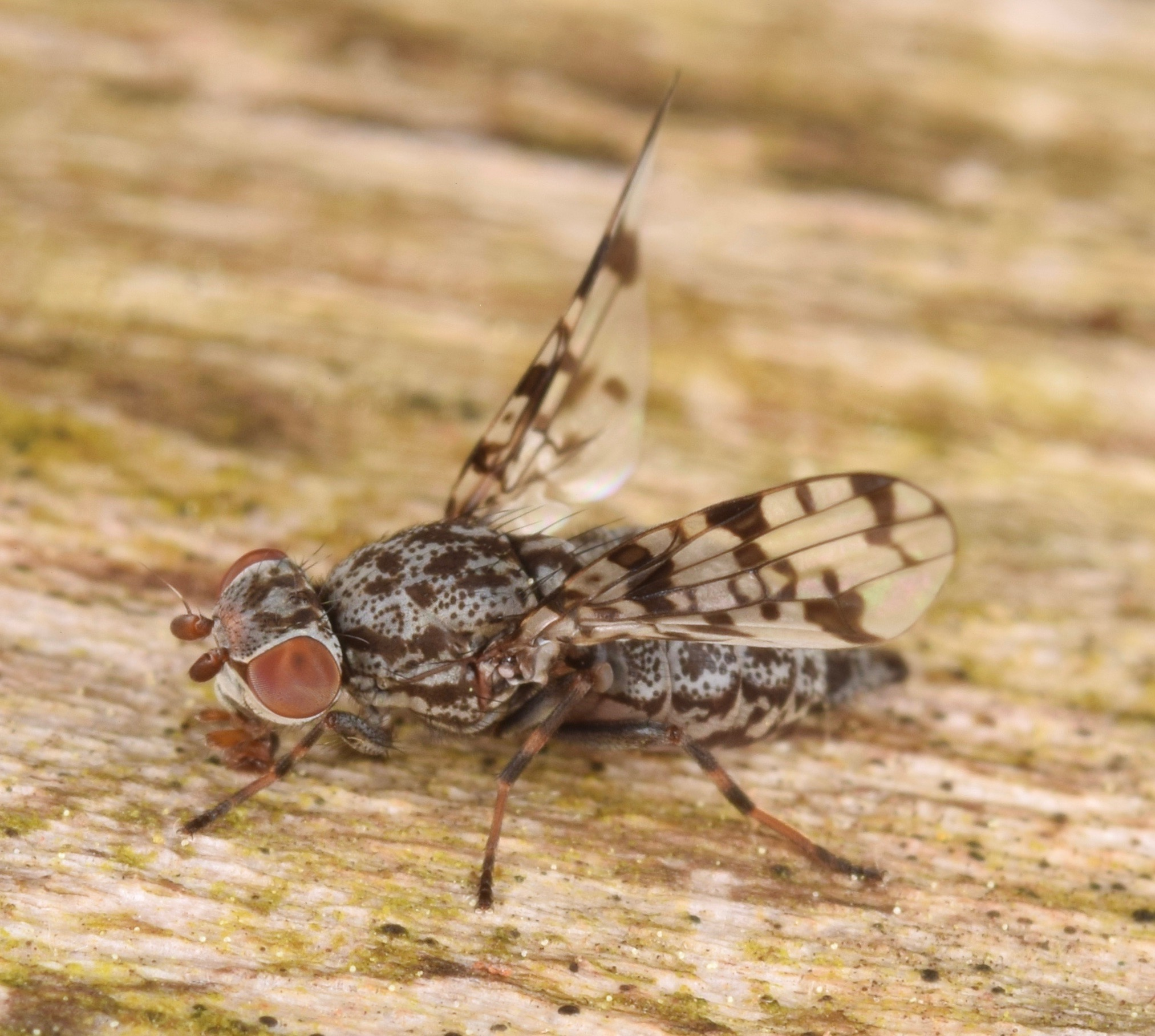

Scientific classification
- Kingdom: Animalia
- Phylum: Arthropoda
- Class: Insecta
- Order: Diptera
- Family: Ulidiidae
- Subfamily: Otitinae
- Tribe: Myennidini
- Genus: Pseudotephritis
- Species: P. corticalis

Binomial name
- Pseudotephritis corticalis (Loew, 1873)

Synonyms
- Stictocephala corticalis Loew, 1873; Myennis trypetoptera Hennig, 1939; Pseudotephritis trypetoptera (Hennig, 1939)

= Pseudotephritis corticalis =

Species of fly

Pseudotephritis corticalis is a species of picture-winged fly in the genus Pseudotephritis of the family Ulidiidae

== Distribution ==
Germany, Denmark, Norway, and northwest Russia.
