= Namibotites argentata =

Scientific classification
- Kingdom: Animalia
- Phylum: Arthropoda
- Class: Insecta
- Order: Diptera
- Family: Ulidiidae
- Subfamily: Otitinae
- Tribe: Myennidini
- Genus: Namibotites
- Species: N. argentata

Binomial name
- Namibotites argentata Barraclough, 2000

Species of fly

Namibotites argentata is a species of ulidiid or picture-winged fly in the genus Namibotites of the family Tephritidae.

== Distribution ==
Namibia.
