= Oedopa ascriptiva =

Scientific classification
- Kingdom: Animalia
- Phylum: Arthropoda
- Class: Insecta
- Order: Diptera
- Family: Ulidiidae
- Subfamily: Otitinae
- Tribe: Myennidini
- Genus: Oedopa
- Species: O. ascriptiva

Binomial name
- Oedopa ascriptiva Hendel, 1909

Species of fly

Oedopa ascriptiva is a species of ulidiid or picture-winged fly in the genus Oedopa of the family Ulidiidae.

== Distribution ==
It is mainly found in the United States.
