= Ulidiotites dakotana =

Scientific classification
- Kingdom: Animalia
- Phylum: Arthropoda
- Class: Insecta
- Order: Diptera
- Family: Ulidiidae
- Subfamily: Otitinae
- Tribe: Myennidini
- Genus: Ulidiotites
- Species: U. dakotana

Binomial name
- Ulidiotites dakotana Steyskal, 1961

Species of fly

Ulidiotites dakotana is a species of ulidiid or picture-winged fly in the genus Ulidiotites of the family Ulidiidae.

== Distribution ==
United States.
