= Neodyscrasis steyskali =

Scientific classification
- Kingdom: Animalia
- Phylum: Arthropoda
- Class: Insecta
- Order: Diptera
- Family: Ulidiidae
- Subfamily: Otitinae
- Tribe: Myennidini
- Genus: Neodyscrasis
- Species: N. steyskali

Binomial name
- Neodyscrasis steyskali Hernández-Ortiz, 1988

Synonyms
- Pseudodyscrasis steyskali Hernández-Ortiz, 1988

Species of fly

Neodyscrasis steyskali is a species of ulidiid or picture-winged fly in the genus Neodyscrasis of the family Ulidiidae.

== Distribution ==
Mexico.
