= Myennis tricolor =

Scientific classification
- Kingdom: Animalia
- Phylum: Arthropoda
- Class: Insecta
- Order: Diptera
- Family: Ulidiidae
- Subfamily: Otitinae
- Tribe: Myennidini
- Genus: Myennis
- Species: M. tricolor

Binomial name
- Myennis tricolor (Hendel, 1909)

Species of fly

Myennis tricolor is a species of ulidiid or picture-winged fly in the genus Myennis of the family Ulidiidae.

== Distribution ==
Turkmenistan.
