= Myennis nebulosa =

Scientific classification
- Kingdom: Animalia
- Phylum: Arthropoda
- Class: Insecta
- Order: Diptera
- Family: Ulidiidae
- Subfamily: Otitinae
- Tribe: Myennidini
- Genus: Myennis
- Species: M. nebulosa

Binomial name
- Myennis nebulosa Krivosheina & Krivosheina, 1997

Species of fly

Myennis nebulosa is a species of ulidiid or picture-winged fly in the genus Myennis of the family Ulidiidae.

== Distribution ==
Turkmenistan.
