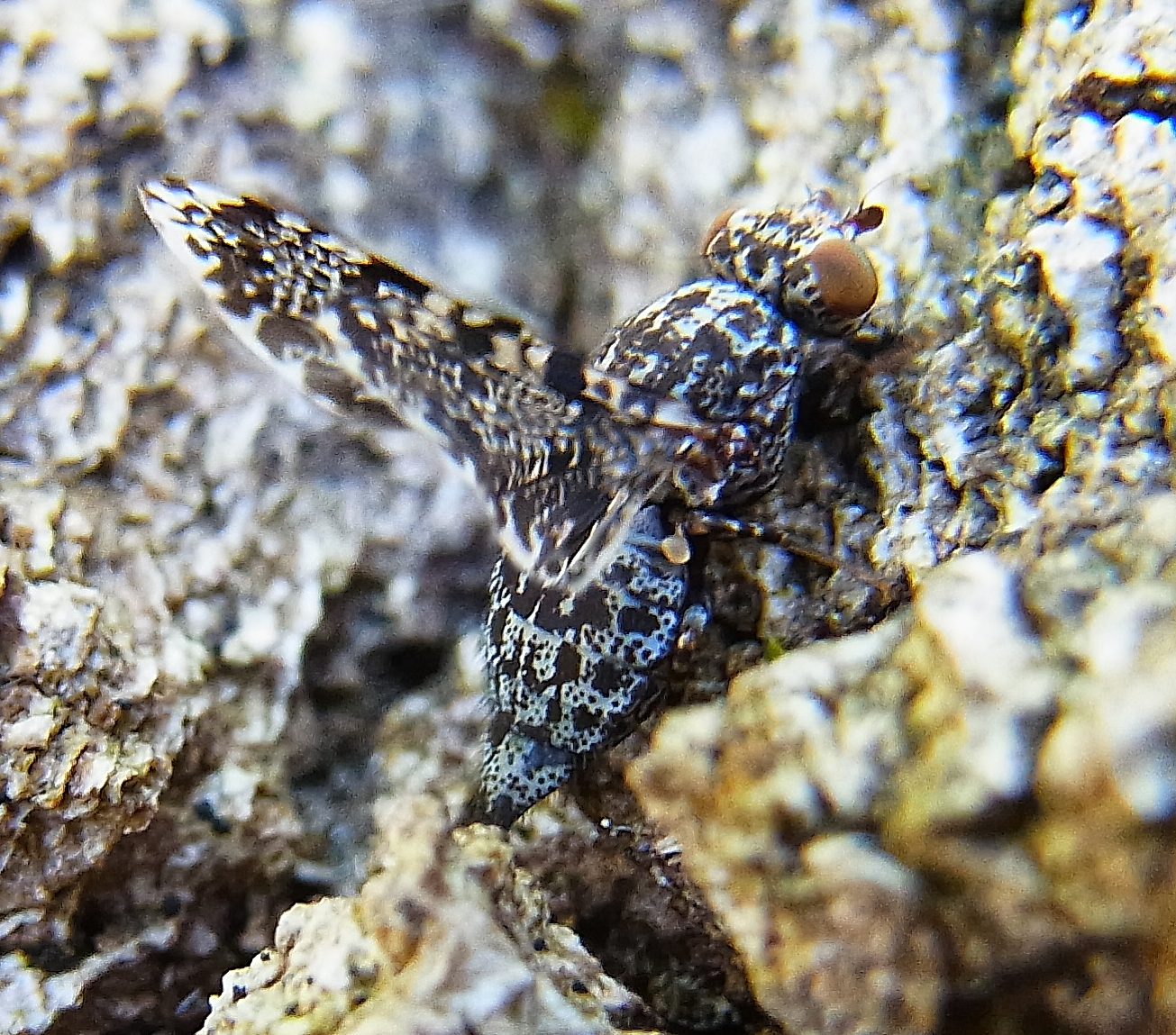

Scientific classification
- Kingdom: Animalia
- Phylum: Arthropoda
- Clade: Pancrustacea
- Class: Insecta
- Order: Diptera
- Family: Ulidiidae
- Subfamily: Otitinae
- Tribe: Myennidini
- Genus: Callopistromyia
- Species: C. annulipes

Binomial name
- Callopistromyia annulipes (Macquart, 1855)

Synonyms
- Platystoma annulipes Macquart, 1855

= Callopistromyia annulipes =

Species of fly

The peacock fly (Callopistromyia annulipes) is a species of picture-winged flies in the genus Callopistromyia of the family Ulidiidae. They are native to and widespread across North America. This species has recently been introduced accidentally to Europe, and is known from Switzerland, Germany, the Netherlands, France, Italy, Slovenia, Slovakia, Hungary, Czechia, Austria, Belgium, Poland, Ukraine, Romania, San Marino and Croatia.

== Behaviour ==
Males and females posture and strut on rotting trees or logs with their wings raised vertically and pointed forward. The resemblance to a peacock's tail is enhanced by blue reflections.
