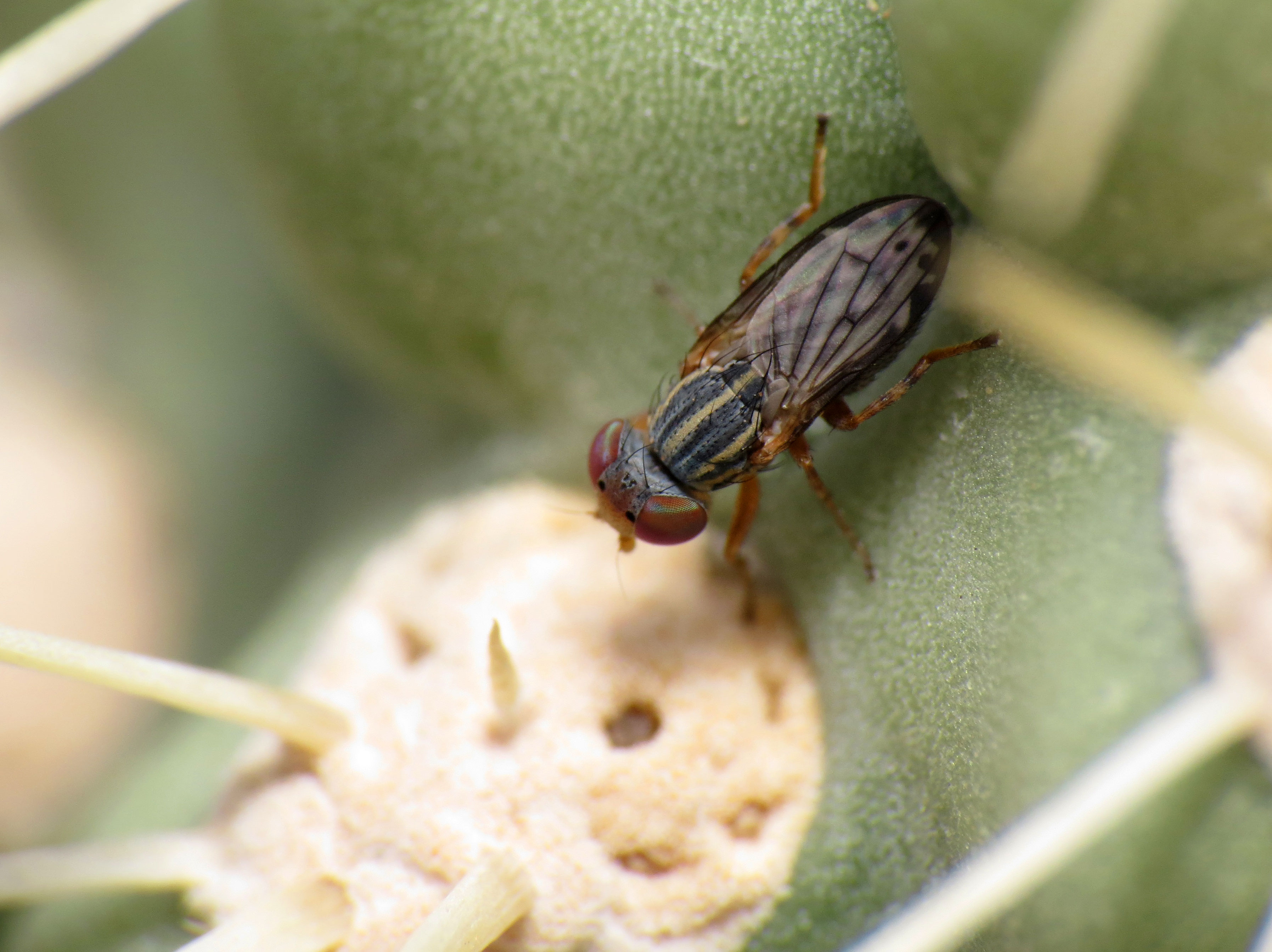
- Paroedopa punctigera

Scientific classification
- Kingdom: Animalia
- Phylum: Arthropoda
- Class: Insecta
- Order: Diptera
- Family: Ulidiidae
- Subfamily: Otitinae
- Tribe: Myennidini
- Genus: Paroedopa
- Species: P. punctigera

Binomial name
- Paroedopa punctigera (Coquillett, 1900)

= Paroedopa punctigera =

Species of fly

Paroedopa punctigera is a species of ulidiid or picture-winged fly in the genus Paroedopa of the family Ulidiidae.

== Distribution ==
United States.
