= Pseudotephritis millepunctata =

Scientific classification
- Kingdom: Animalia
- Phylum: Arthropoda
- Class: Insecta
- Order: Diptera
- Family: Ulidiidae
- Subfamily: Otitinae
- Tribe: Myennidini
- Genus: Pseudotephritis
- Species: P. millepunctata

Binomial name
- Pseudotephritis millepunctata (Hennig, 1939)

Synonyms
- Myennis millepunctata Hennig, 1939

Species of fly

Pseudotephritis millepunctata is a species of ulidiid or picture-winged fly in the genus Pseudotephritis of the family Tephritidae.

== Distribution ==
Russian Far East.
