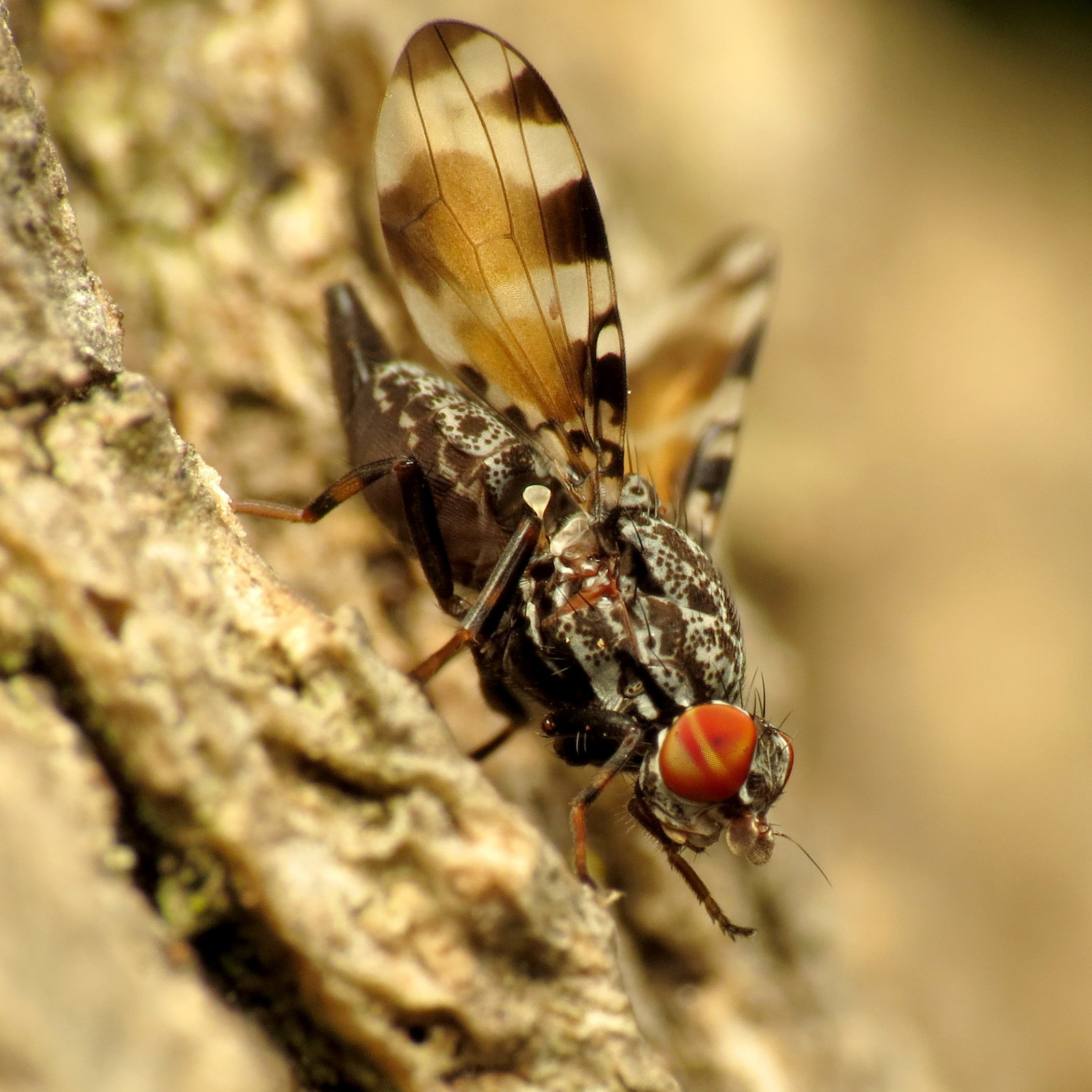

Scientific classification
- Kingdom: Animalia
- Phylum: Arthropoda
- Class: Insecta
- Order: Diptera
- Family: Ulidiidae
- Subfamily: Otitinae
- Tribe: Myennidini
- Genus: Pseudotephritis
- Species: P. vau

Binomial name
- Pseudotephritis vau (Say, 1830)

Synonyms
- Ortalis vau Say, 1830; Pseudotephritis vau f. californica Steyskal, 1962; Pseudotephritis vau f. idahoana Steyskal, 1962; Pseudotephritis conjuncta Johnson, 1921; Pseudotephritis metzi Johnson, 1915

= Pseudotephritis vau =

Species of fly

Pseudotephritis vau is a species of picture-winged fly in the family Ulidiidae.

== Distribution ==
Canada, United States.
