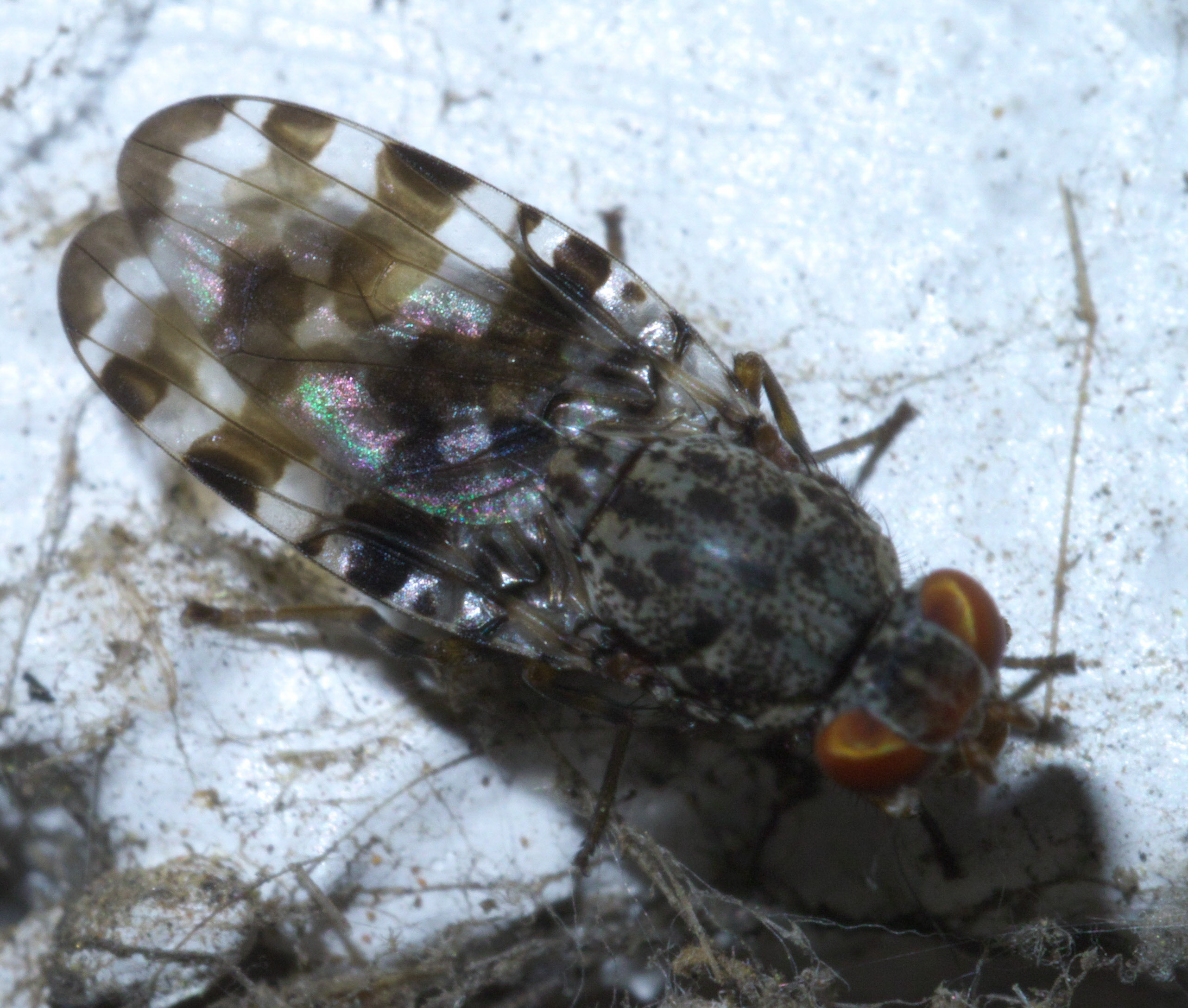
- Pseudotephritis approximata

Scientific classification
- Kingdom: Animalia
- Phylum: Arthropoda
- Class: Insecta
- Order: Diptera
- Family: Ulidiidae
- Subfamily: Otitinae
- Tribe: Myennidini
- Genus: Pseudotephritis; Johnson, 1902

Type species
- Ortalis vau Say, 1830

Synonyms
- Stictocephala Loew, 1873

= Pseudotephritis =

Genus of flies

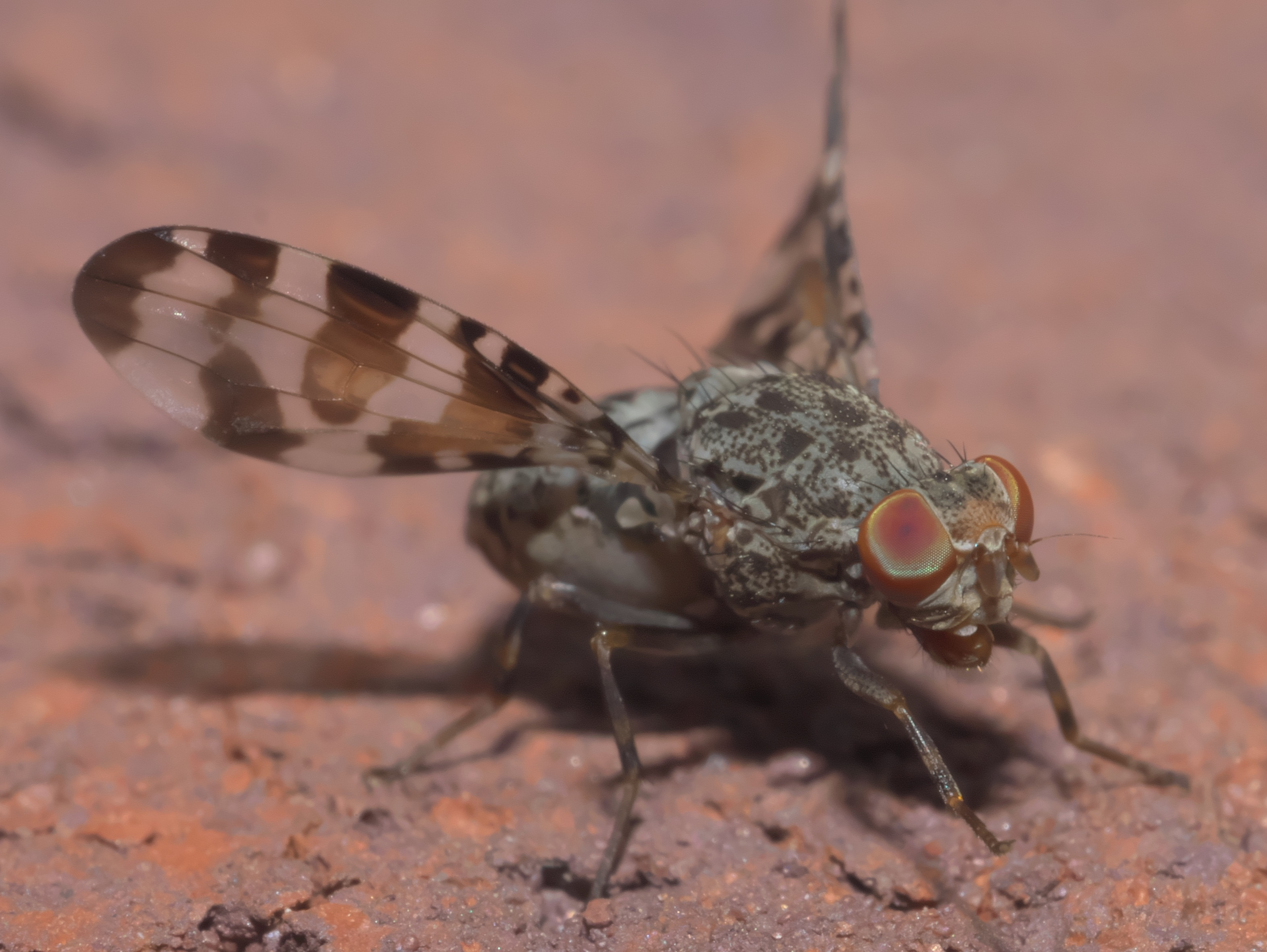
Pseudotephritis approximata

Pseudotephritis is a genus of picture-winged flies in the family Ulidiidae.

== Species ==
- Pseudotephritis approximata Banks, 1914
- Pseudotephritis corticalis (Loew, 1873)
- Pseudotephritis millepunctata (Hennig, 1939)
- Pseudotephritis ussurica Krivosheina & Krivosheina, 1997
- Pseudotephritis vau (Say, 1830)
