= Namibotites =

Scientific classification
- Kingdom: Animalia
- Phylum: Arthropoda
- Class: Insecta
- Order: Diptera
- Family: Ulidiidae
- Subfamily: Otitinae
- Tribe: Myennidini
- Genus: Namibotites; Barraclough, 2000

Type species
- Namibotites argentata Barraclough, 2000

Genus of flies

Namibotites is a genus of fly in the family Ulidiidae.

== Species ==
- Namibotites argentata Barraclough, 2000

== Distribution ==
Namibia.
