= Stictomyia punctata =

Scientific classification
- Kingdom: Animalia
- Phylum: Arthropoda
- Class: Insecta
- Order: Diptera
- Family: Ulidiidae
- Genus: Stictomyia
- Species: S. punctata

Binomial name
- Stictomyia punctata Coquillett, 1901

Species of fly

Stictomyia punctata is a species of ulidiid or picture-winged fly in the genus Stictomyia of the family Ulidiidae.
