= Ulidiotites =

Scientific classification
- Domain: Eukaryota
- Kingdom: Animalia
- Phylum: Arthropoda
- Class: Insecta
- Order: Diptera
- Family: Ulidiidae
- Subfamily: Otitinae
- Tribe: Myennidini
- Genus: Ulidiotites; Steyskal, 1961

Type species
- Ulidiotites dakotana Steyskal, 1961

Genus of flies

Ulidiotites is a genus of picture-winged flies in the family Ulidiidae.

== Species ==
- Ulidiotites dakotana Steyskal, 1961
