= Neodyscrasis =

Scientific classification
- Kingdom: Animalia
- Phylum: Arthropoda
- Class: Insecta
- Order: Diptera
- Family: Ulidiidae
- Subfamily: Otitinae
- Tribe: Myennidini
- Genus: Neodyscrasis; Kameneva & Korneyev, 2006

Type species
- Pseudodyscrasis steyskali Hernández-Ortiz, 1988

Genus of flies

Neodyscrasis is a genus of fly in the family Ulidiidae.

== Species ==
- Neodyscrasis steyskali Hernández-Ortiz, 1988

== Distribution ==
Mexico.
