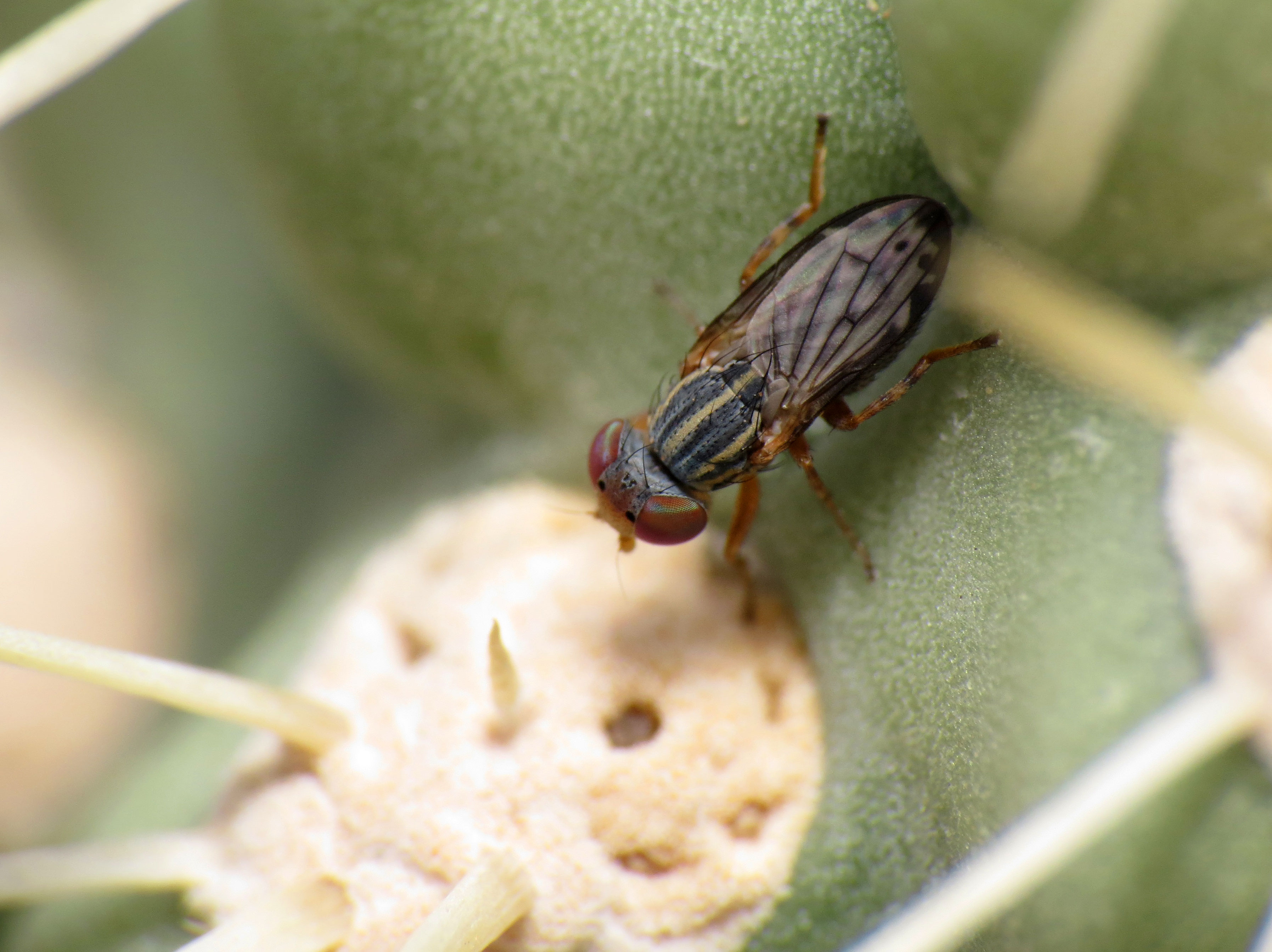
- Paroedopa punctigera

Scientific classification
- Kingdom: Animalia
- Phylum: Arthropoda
- Class: Insecta
- Order: Diptera
- Family: Ulidiidae
- Subfamily: Otitinae
- Tribe: Myennidini
- Genus: Paroedopa; Coquillett, 1900

Type species
- Paroedopa punctigera Coquillett, 1900

= Paroedopa =

Genus of flies

Paroedopa is a genus of picture-winged flies in the family Ulidiidae.

== Species ==
- Paroedopa punctigera Coquillett, 1900

== Distribution ==
United States.
