= Arborotites =

Scientific classification
- Kingdom: Animalia
- Phylum: Arthropoda
- Clade: Pancrustacea
- Class: Insecta
- Order: Diptera
- Family: Ulidiidae
- Subfamily: Otitinae
- Tribe: Myennidini
- Genus: Arborotites; Barraclough, 2000

Type species
- Arborotites africana Barraclough, 2000

Genus of flies

Arborotites is a genus of fly in the family Ulidiidae.

== Species ==
- Arborotites stuckenbergi Enderlein, 1921

== Distribution ==
South Africa.
