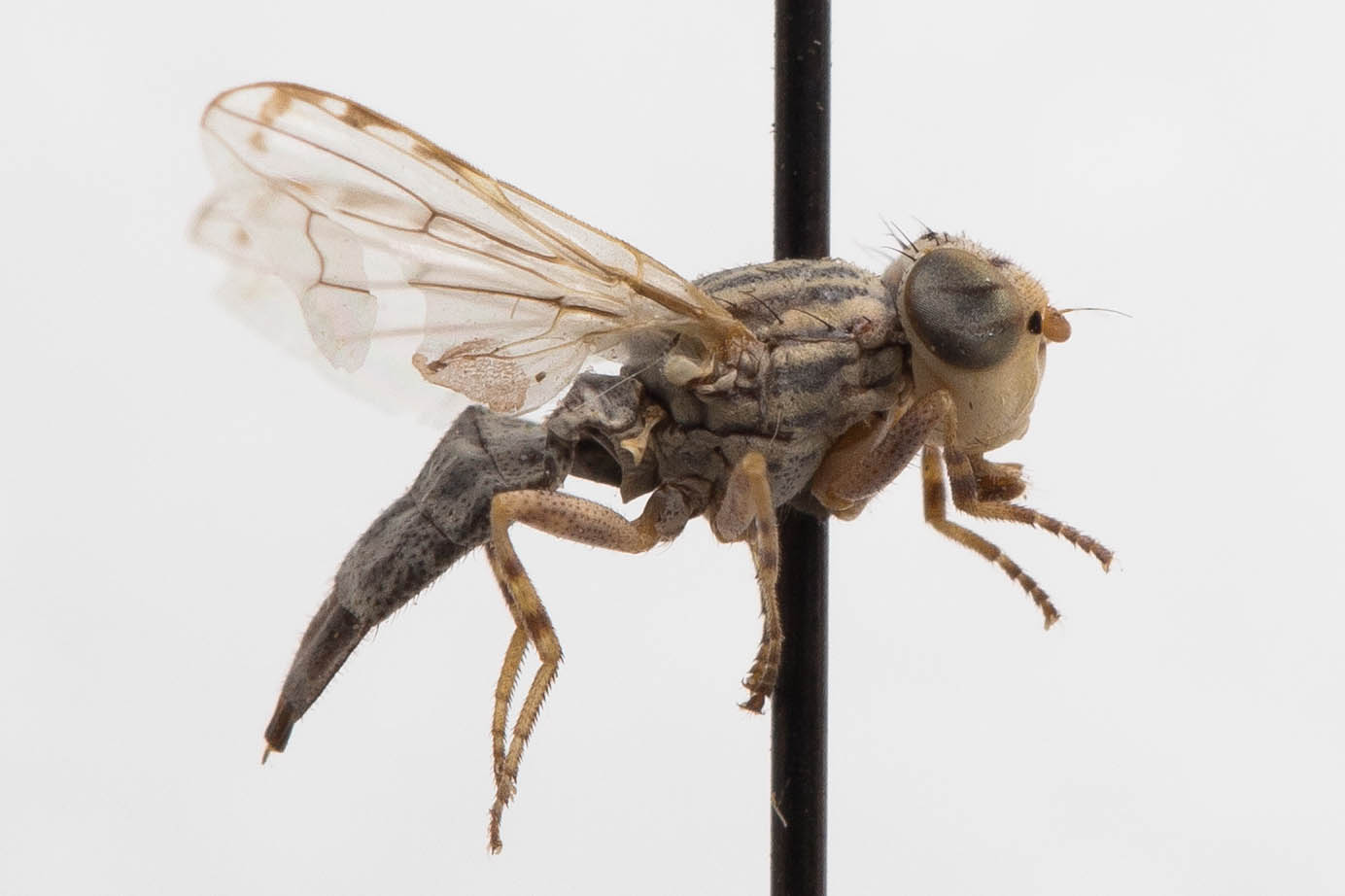
- Oedopa capito

Scientific classification
- Kingdom: Animalia
- Phylum: Arthropoda
- Class: Insecta
- Order: Diptera
- Family: Ulidiidae
- Subfamily: Otitinae
- Tribe: Myennidini
- Genus: Oedopa; Loew, 1868

Type species
- Oedopa capito Loew, 1868

= Oedopa =

Genus of flies

Oedopa is a genus of picture-winged flies in the family Ulidiidae.

== Species ==
- Oedopa ascriptiva Hendel, 1909
- Oedopa capito Loew, 1868
- Oedopa elegans Giglio-Tos, 1893
