= Pseudodyscrasis =

Scientific classification
- Kingdom: Animalia
- Phylum: Arthropoda
- Class: Insecta
- Order: Diptera
- Family: Ulidiidae
- Subfamily: Otitinae
- Tribe: Myennidini
- Genus: Pseudodyscrasis; Hernández-Ortiz, 1988

Type species
- Trypeta scutellaris (Wiedemann, 1830)

Genus of flies

Pseudodyscrasis is a genus of picture-winged flies in the family Ulidiidae.

== Species ==
- Pseudodyscrasis scutellaris (Wiedemann, 1830)
