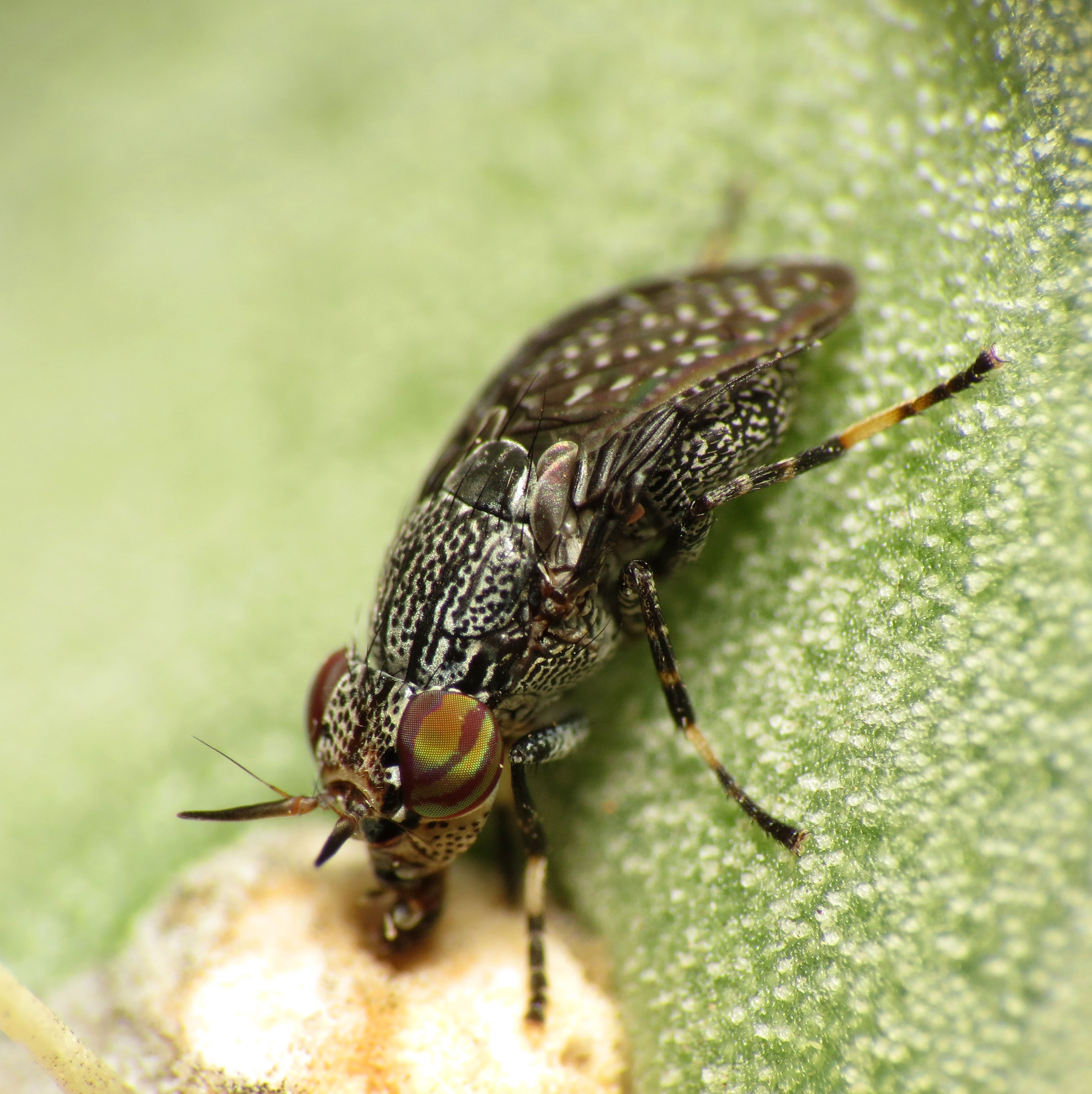
- Stictomyia longicornis

Scientific classification
- Kingdom: Animalia
- Phylum: Arthropoda
- Class: Insecta
- Order: Diptera
- Family: Ulidiidae
- Subfamily: Otitinae
- Tribe: Myennidini
- Genus: Stictomyia; Bigot, 1885

Type species
- Stictomyia longicornis Bigot, 1885

= Stictomyia =

Genus of flies

Stictomyia is a genus of picture-winged flies in the family Ulidiidae.

== Species ==
- Stictomyia longicornis Bigot, 1885
- Stictomyia punctata Coquillett, 1900
