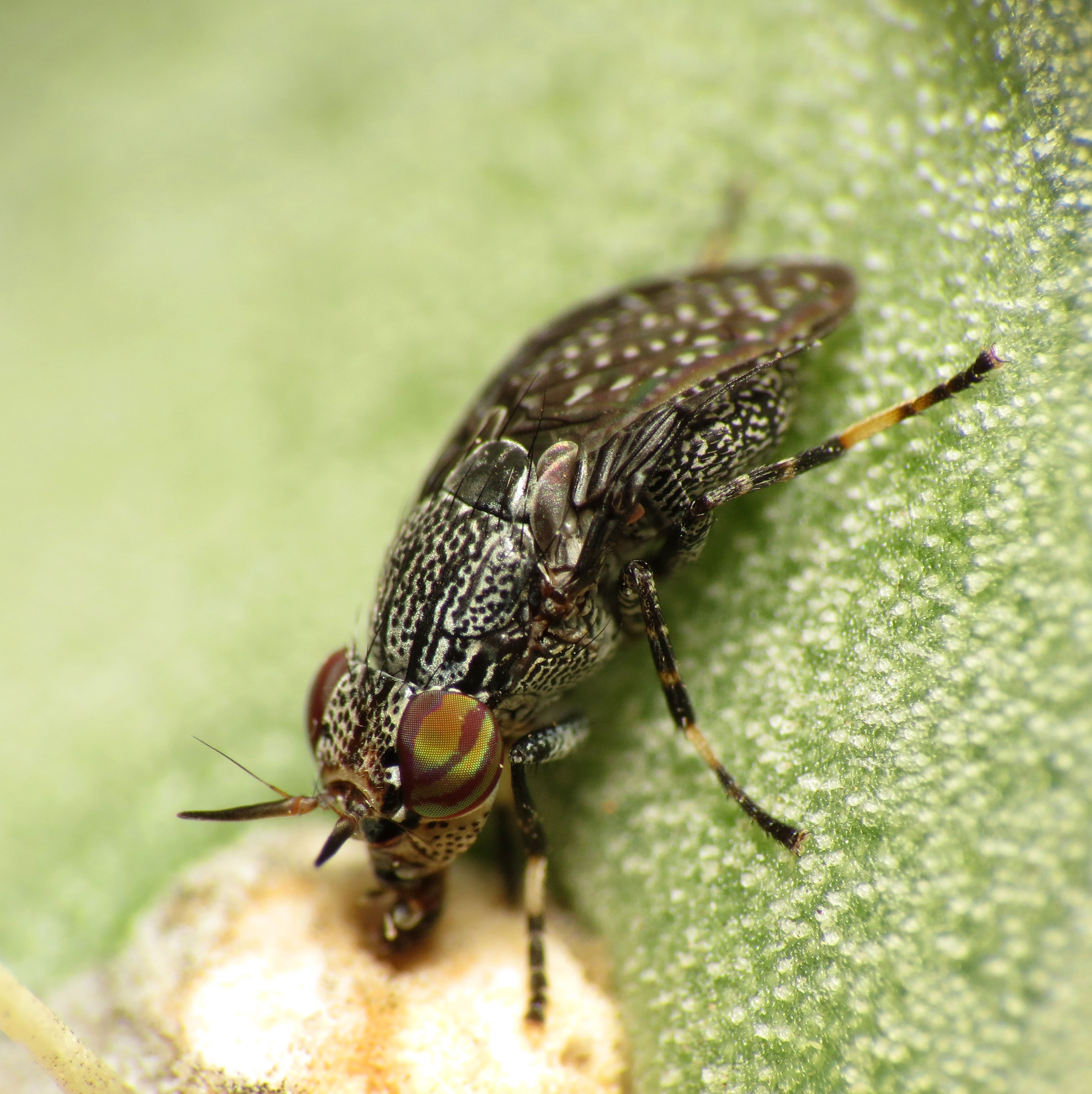
- Stictomyia longicornis

Scientific classification
- Kingdom: Animalia
- Phylum: Arthropoda
- Class: Insecta
- Order: Diptera
- Family: Ulidiidae
- Subfamily: Otitinae
- Tribe: Myennidini
- Genus: Stictomyia
- Species: S. longicornis

Binomial name
- Stictomyia longicornis Bigot, 1885

= Stictomyia longicornis =

Species of fly

Stictomyia longicornis is a species of ulidiid or picture-winged fly in the genus Stictomyia of the family Ulidiidae.

== Distribution ==
Mexico.
