= Dyscrasis =

Scientific classification
- Kingdom: Animalia
- Phylum: Arthropoda
- Class: Insecta
- Order: Diptera
- Family: Ulidiidae
- Subfamily: Otitinae
- Tribe: Myennidini
- Genus: Dyscrasis; Aldrich, 1932

Type species
- Dyscrasis hendeli Aldrich, 1932

Genus of flies

Dyscrasis is a genus of picture-winged flies in the family Ulidiidae.

== Species ==
- Dyscrasis hendeli Aldrich, 1932
