= Stictoedopa =

Scientific classification
- Kingdom: Animalia
- Phylum: Arthropoda
- Class: Insecta
- Order: Diptera
- Family: Ulidiidae
- Subfamily: Otitinae
- Tribe: Myennidini
- Genus: Stictoedopa; Brèthes, 1926

Type species
- Stictoedopa ruizi Brèthes, 1926

Genus of flies

Stictoedopa is a genus of fly in the family Ulidiidae.

== Species ==
- Stictoedopa ruizi Brèthes, 1926

== Distribution ==
Chile.
