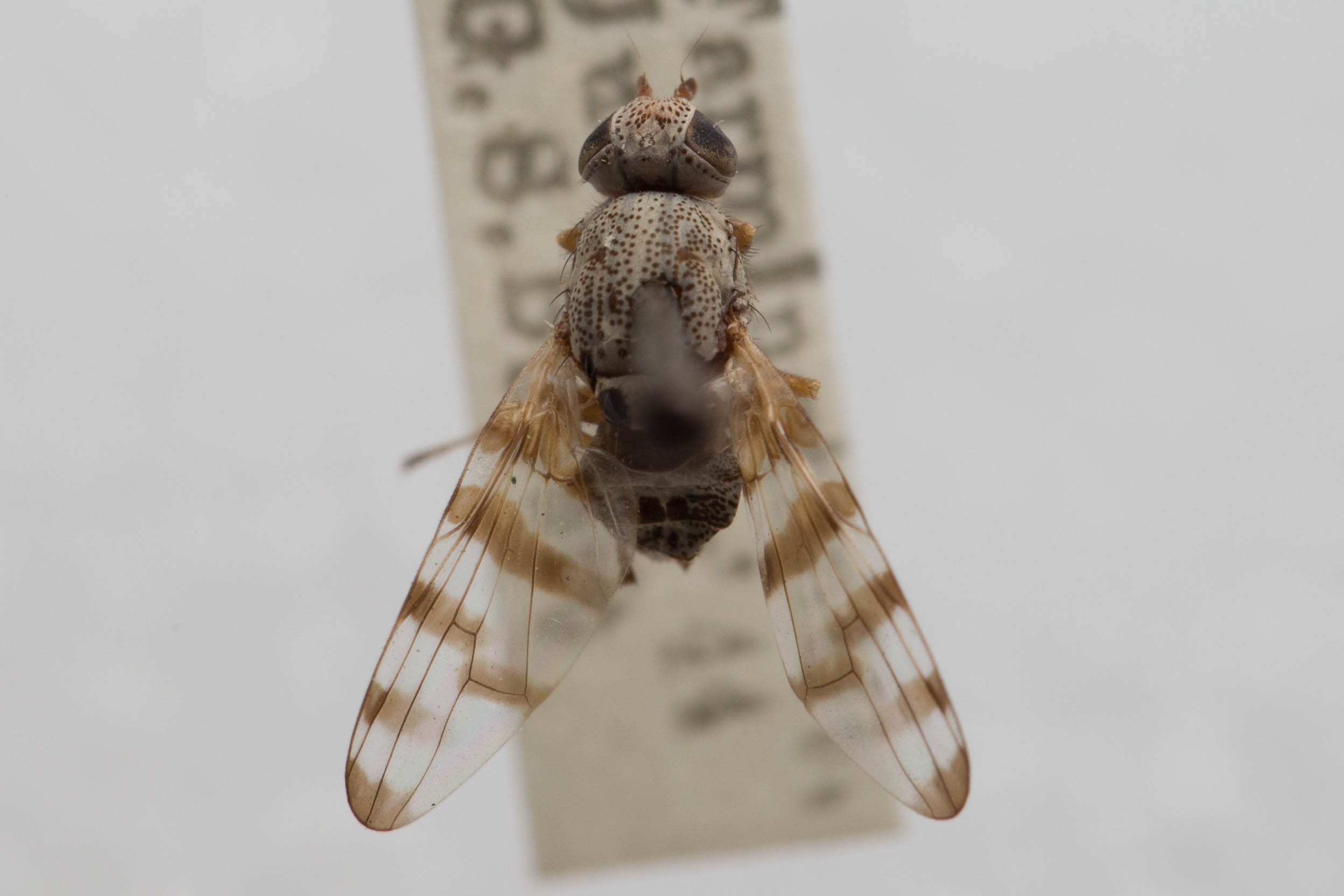

Scientific classification
- Kingdom: Animalia
- Phylum: Arthropoda
- Class: Insecta
- Order: Diptera
- Family: Ulidiidae
- Subfamily: Otitinae
- Tribe: Myennidini
- Genus: Pseudotephritina
- Species: P. inaequalis

Binomial name
- Pseudotephritina inaequalis (Malloch, 1931)

Synonyms
- Pseudotephritis inaequalis f. davisensis Steyskal, 1962; Pseudotephritis inaequalis Malloch, 1931

= Pseudotephritina inaequalis =

Species of fly

Pseudotephritina inaequalis is a species of picture-winged fly in the family Ulidiidae.

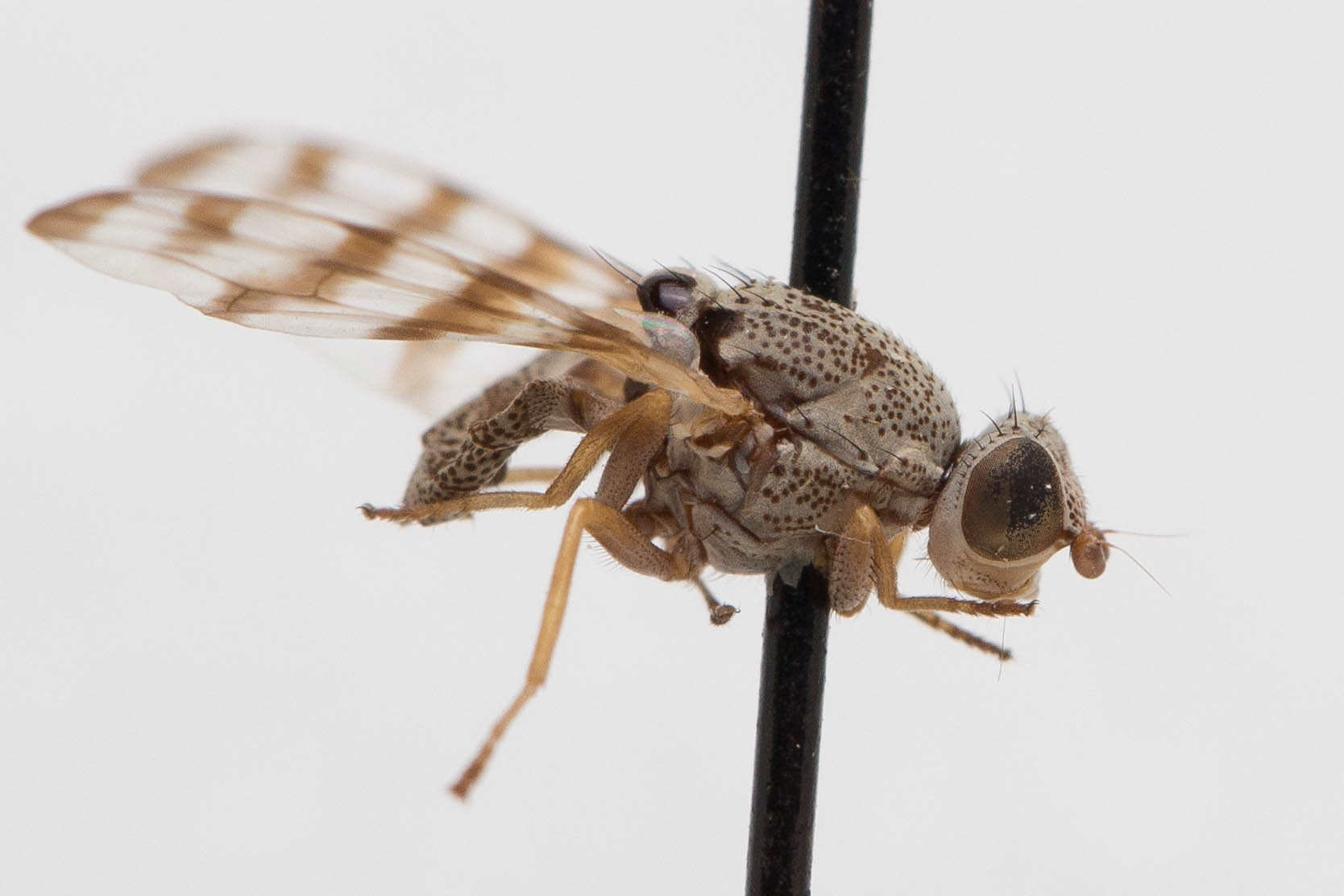

== Distribution ==
United States.
