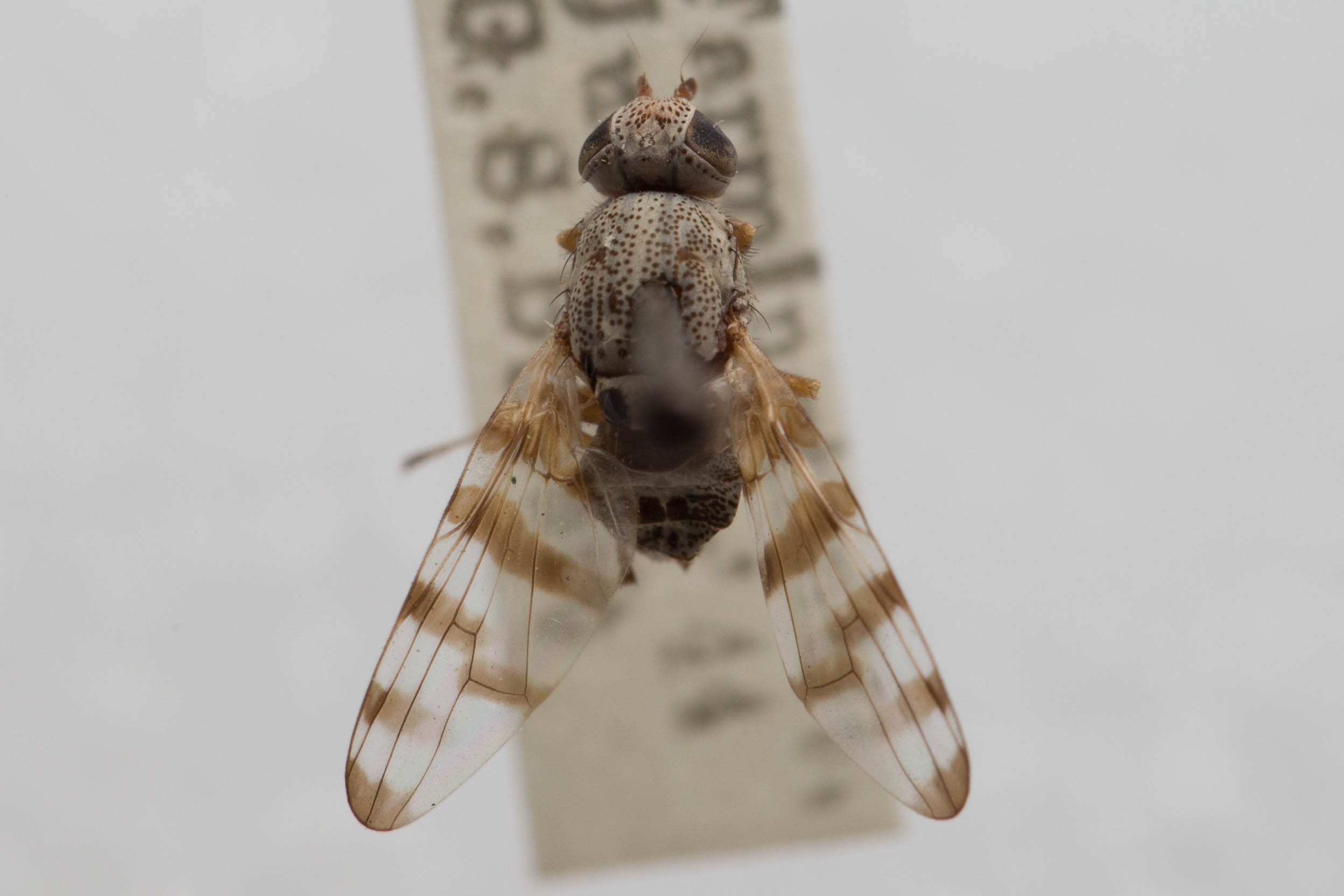
- Pseudotephritina inaequalis

Scientific classification
- Kingdom: Animalia
- Phylum: Arthropoda
- Class: Insecta
- Order: Diptera
- Family: Ulidiidae
- Subfamily: Otitinae
- Tribe: Myennidini
- Genus: Pseudotephritina; Malloch, 1931

Type species
- Stictocephala cribellum Loew, 1873

= Pseudotephritina =

Genus of flies

Pseudotephritina is a genus of picture-winged flies in the family Ulidiidae. There are at least two described species in Pseudotephritina.

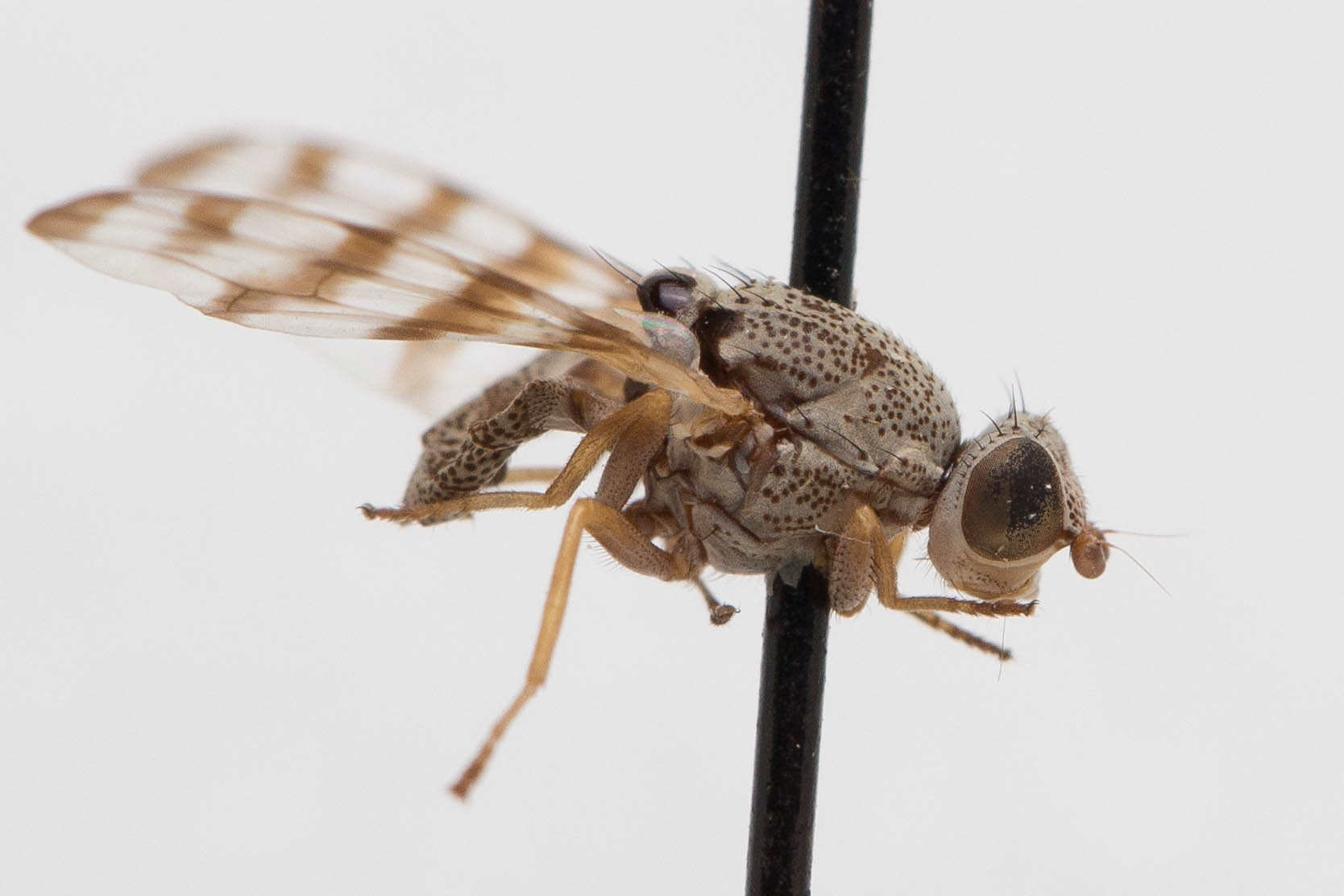
Pseudotephritina inaequalis

== Species ==
- Pseudotephritina cribellum (Loew, 1873)
- Pseudotephritina inaequalis (Malloch, 1931)
