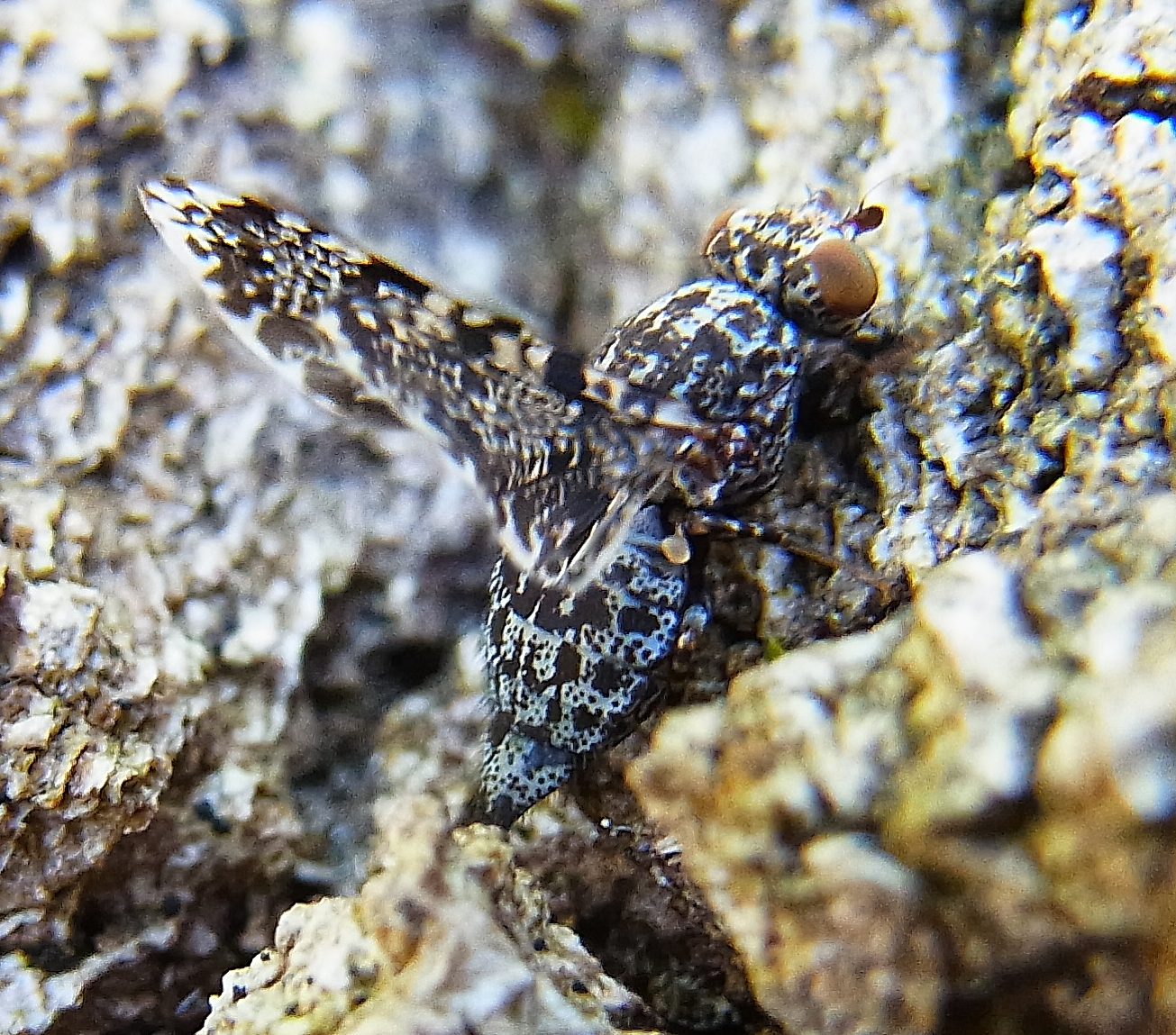
- Callopistromyia annulipes

Scientific classification
- Kingdom: Animalia
- Phylum: Arthropoda
- Class: Insecta
- Order: Diptera
- Family: Ulidiidae
- Subfamily: Otitinae
- Tribe: Myennidini
- Genus: Callopistromyia; Hendel, 1907

Type species
- Platystoma annulipes Macquart, 1855

Synonyms
- Callopistria Loew, 1873

= Callopistromyia =

Genus of flies

Callopistromyia is a genus of picture-winged flies in the family Ulidiidae.

== Species ==
- Callopistromyia annulipes (Macquart, 1855)
- Callopistromyia strigula (Loew, 1873)
