= Acatochaeta =

Scientific classification
- Kingdom: Animalia
- Phylum: Arthropoda
- Clade: Pancrustacea
- Class: Insecta
- Order: Diptera
- Family: Ulidiidae
- Subfamily: Otitinae
- Tribe: Myennidini
- Genus: Acatochaeta; Enderlein, 1921
- Species: A. africana

Binomial name
- Acatochaeta africana Enderlein, 1921

Genus of flies

Acatochaeta is a genus of fly in the family Ulidiidae, containing only the single species Acatochaeta africana.

== Distribution ==
Equatorial Guinea.
