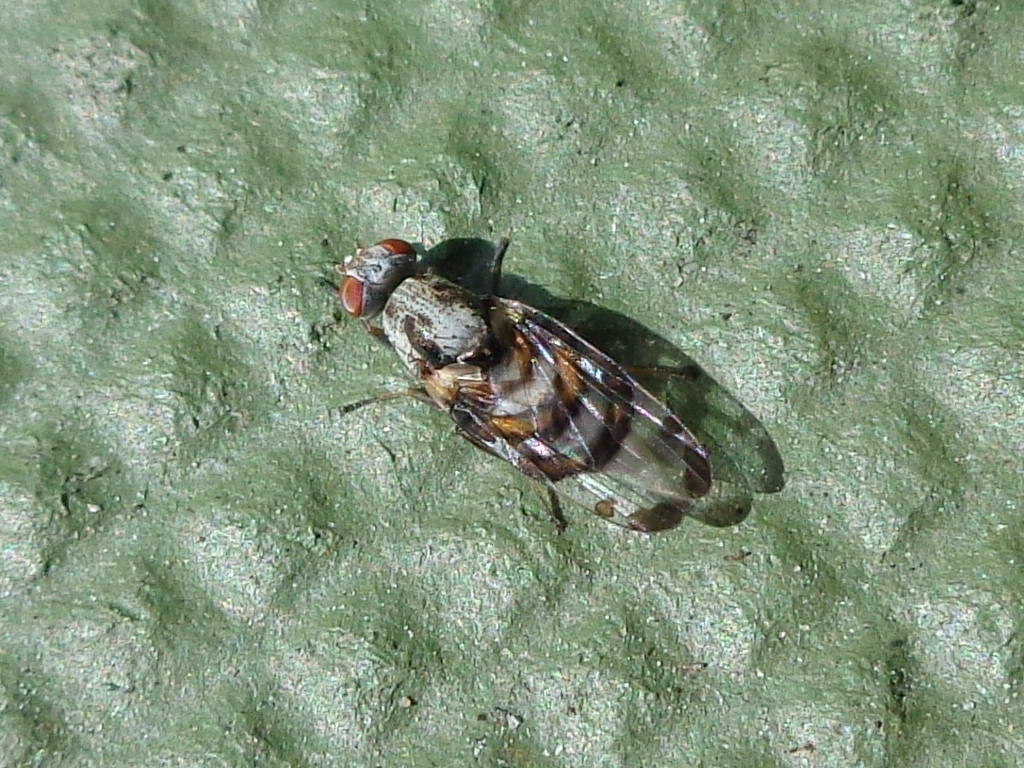
- Myennis octopunctata

Scientific classification
- Kingdom: Animalia
- Phylum: Arthropoda
- Clade: Pancrustacea
- Class: Insecta
- Order: Diptera
- Family: Ulidiidae
- Subfamily: Otitinae
- Tribe: Myennidini
- Genus: Myennis; Robineau-Desvoidy, 1830

Type species
- Scatophaga fasciata Fabricius, 1805

Synonyms
- Miennis Rondani, 1869; Miennys Rondani, 1869

= Myennis =

Genus of flies

Myennis is a genus of picture-winged flies in the family Ulidiidae.

== Species ==
- Myennis mandschurica Hering, 1956
- Myennis monticola Stackelberg, 1945
- Myennis nebulosa Krivosheina & Krivosheina, 1997
- Myennis octopunctata (Coquebert, 1798)
- Myennis sibirica Portschinsky, 1891
- Myennis tricolor Hendel, 1909
