= Jean Antoine Coquebert de Montbret =

French entomologist

Jean Antoine Coquebert de Montbret (1753, Paris- 6 April 1825) was a French entomologist. He wrote Illustratio iconographica insectorum quae in musaeis parisinis observavit et in lucem edidit Joh. Christ. Fabricius, praemissis ejusdem descriptionibus; accedunt species plurimae, vel minus aut nondum cognitae, Paris: P. Didot, 1799-1804 an illustrated work on insect specimens in the Museum d'Histoire Naturelle in Paris. The insects appear as inside an insect box.

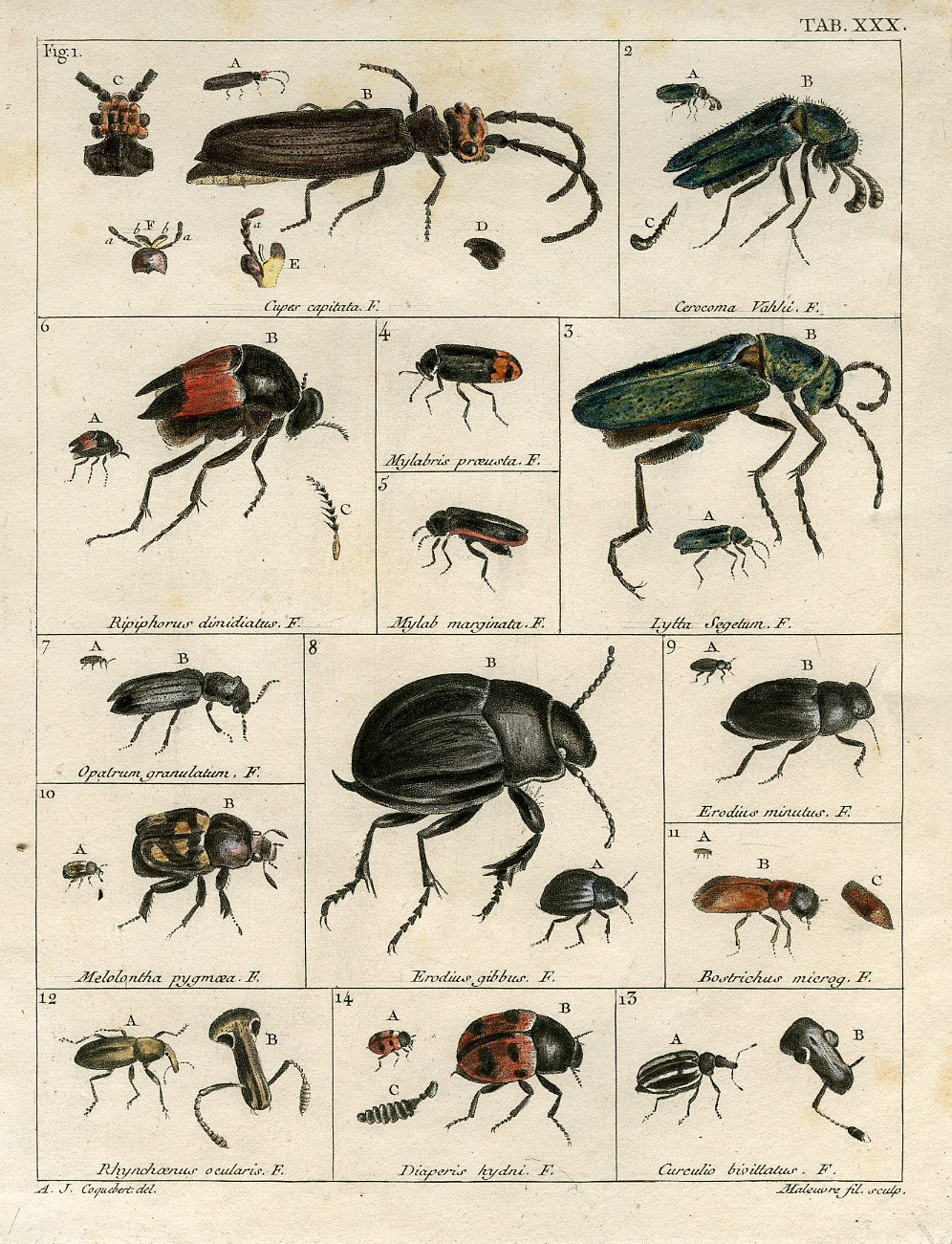
Illustratio iconographica insectorum quae in musaeis parisinis
