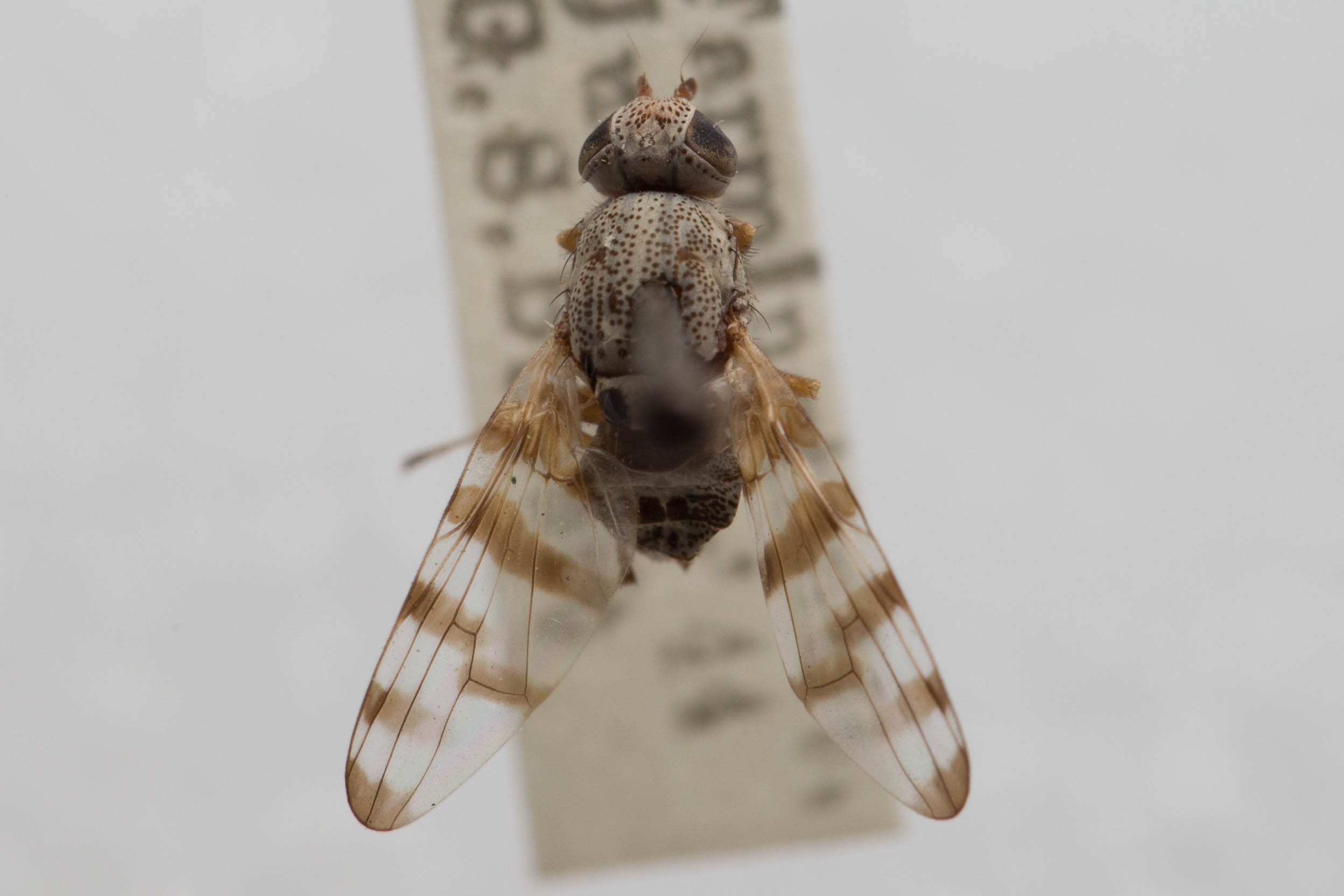
- Pseudotephritina inaequalis

Scientific classification
- Kingdom: Animalia
- Phylum: Arthropoda
- Class: Insecta
- Order: Diptera
- Family: Ulidiidae
- Subfamily: Otitinae
- Tribe: Myennidini; Kameneva & Korneyev, 2006

= Myennidini =

Tribe of flies

Myennidini is a tribe of picture-winged flies in the family Ulidiidae.

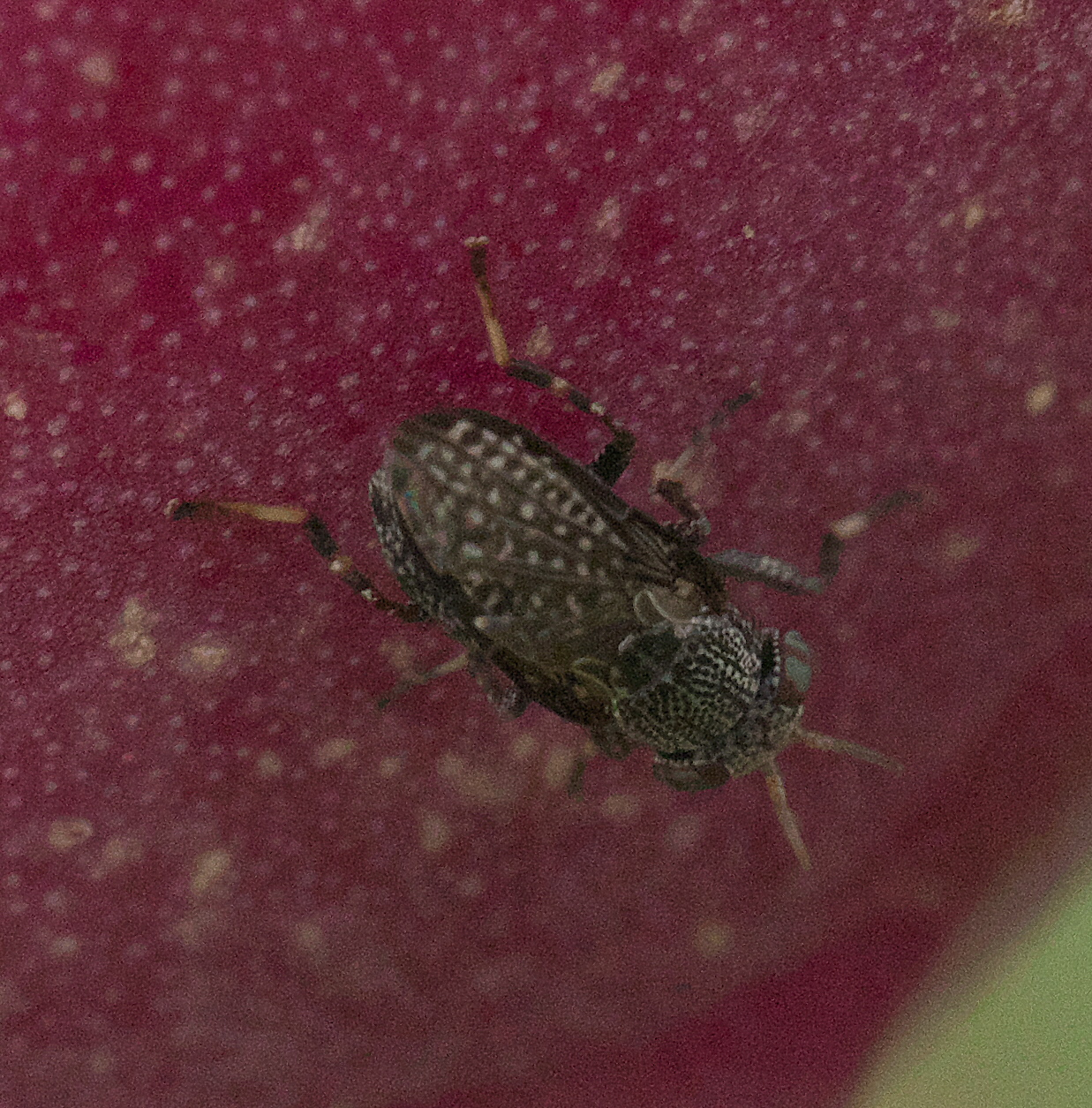
Stictomyia longicornis

== Genera ==
- Acatochaeta Enderlein, 1921
- Arborotites Barraclough, 2000
- Callopistromyia Hendel, 1907
- Dyscrasis Aldrich, 1932
- Myennis Robineau-Desvoidy, 1830
- Namibotites Barraclough, 2000
- Neodyscrasis Kameneva & Korneyev, 2006
- Oedopa Loew, 1868
- Paroedopa Coquillett, 1900
- Pseudodyscrasis Hernández-Ortiz, 1988
- Pseudotephritina Malloch, 1931
- Pseudotephritis Johnson, 1902
- Stictoedopa Brèthes, 1926
- Stictomyia Bigot, 1885
- Ulidiotites Steyskal, 1961
