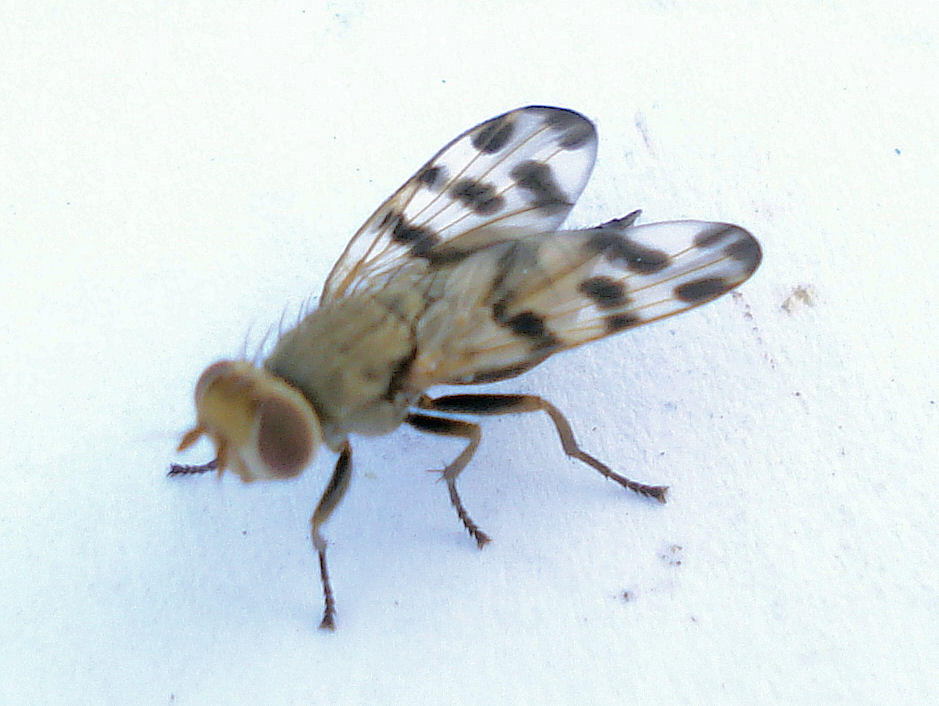
- Melieria crassipennis

Scientific classification
- Kingdom: Animalia
- Phylum: Arthropoda
- Clade: Pancrustacea
- Class: Insecta
- Order: Diptera
- Family: Ulidiidae
- Subfamily: Otitinae
- Tribe: Otitini
- Genus: Melieria; Robineau-Desvoidy, 1830

= Melieria =

Genus of flies

Melieria is a genus of picture-winged fly in the family Ulidiidae.

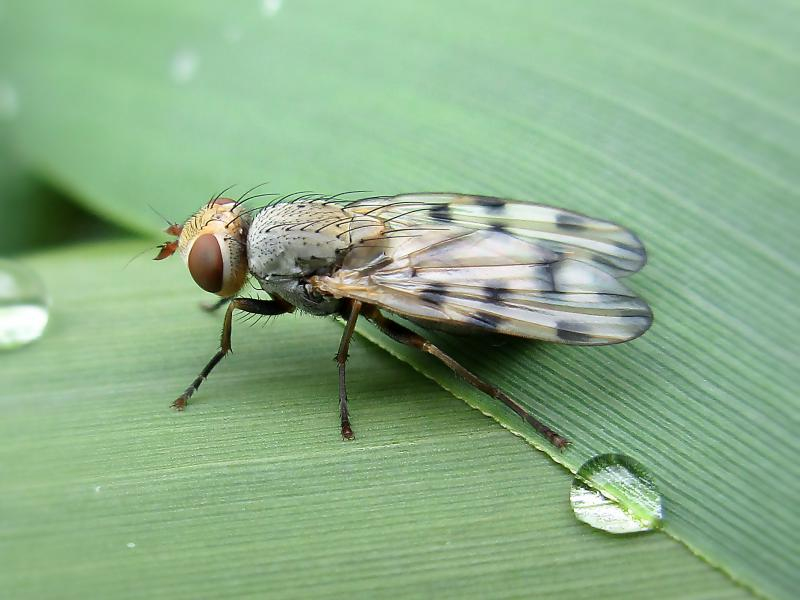
Melieria omissa

== European species ==
- Subgenus Hypochra Loew, 1868

- M. albipennis (Loew, 1846)
- M. albufera (Lyneborg, 1969)
- M. parmensis Rondani, 1869
- M. subapennina Rondani, 1869

- Subgenus Melieria Loew, 1868

- M. acuticornis (Loew, 1854)
- M. cana (Loew, 1858)
- M. crassipennis (Fabricius, 1794)
- M. nana (Loew, 1873)
- M. nigritarsis Becker, 1903
- M. omissa (Meigen, 1826)
- M. picta (Meigen, 1826)
- M. unicolor (Loew, 1854)

- Subgenus Phaeosoma Loew, 1868

- M. atricornis (Mik, 1885)

== World species ==
- Melieria acuticornis (Loew, 1854)
- Melieria albipennis (Loew, 1846)
- Melieria albufera (Lyneborg, 1969)
- Melieria atricornis (Mik, 1885)
- Melieria beckeri Soós, 1971
- Melieria cana (Loew, 1858)
- Melieria clara Kameneva, 1996
- Melieria crassipennis (Fabricius, 1794)
- Melieria dolini Kameneva, 1996
- Melieria felis Kameneva, 1996
- Melieria gangraenosa (Panzer, 1798)
- Melieria imitans Soós, 1971
- Melieria immaculata Becker, 1907
- Melieria kaszabi Soós, 1971
- Melieria latigenis Hendel, 1934
- Melieria limpidipennis Becker, 1907
- Melieria mongolica Soós, 1971
- Melieria nana (Loew, 1873)
- Melieria nigritarsis Becker, 1903
- Melieria nigritarsoides Soós, 1971
- Melieria obscura (Robineau-Desvoidy, 1830)
- Melieria obscuripes (Loew, 1873)
- Melieria occidentalis Coquillett, 1904
- Melieria occulta Becker, 1907
- Melieria ochricornis (Loew, 1873)
- Melieria omissa (Meigen, 1826)
- Melieria oxiana Kameneva, 1996
- Melieria pallipes (Robineau-Desvoidy, 1830)
- Melieria parmensis Rondani, 1869
- Melieria picta (Meigen, 1826)
- Melieria pseudosystata Kameneva, 1996
- Melieria pulicaria (Robineau-Desvoidy, 1830)
- Melieria rubella (Robineau-Desvoidy, 1830)
- Melieria sabuleti Steyskal, 1962
- Melieria similis (Loew, 1873)
- Melieria soosi Kameneva, 2000
- Melieria subapennina Rondani, 1869
- Melieria theodori Kameneva, 2000
- Melieria turcomanica Kameneva, 1996
- Melieria unicolor (Loew, 1854)
