= Melieria imitans =

Scientific classification
- Kingdom: Animalia
- Phylum: Arthropoda
- Clade: Pancrustacea
- Class: Insecta
- Order: Diptera
- Family: Ulidiidae
- Genus: Melieria
- Species: M. imitans

Binomial name
- Melieria imitans Soós, 1971

Species of fly

Melieria imitans is a species of ulidiid or picture-winged fly in the genus Melieria of the family Ulidiidae.
