= Melieria nigritarsis =

Scientific classification
- Kingdom: Animalia
- Phylum: Arthropoda
- Class: Insecta
- Order: Diptera
- Family: Ulidiidae
- Genus: Melieria
- Species: M. nigritarsis

Binomial name
- Melieria nigritarsis Becker, 1903

Species of fly

Melieria nigritarsis is a species of ulidiid or picture-winged fly in the genus Melieria of the family Ulidiidae.
