= Melieria pulicaria =

Scientific classification
- Kingdom: Animalia
- Phylum: Arthropoda
- Clade: Pancrustacea
- Class: Insecta
- Order: Diptera
- Family: Ulidiidae
- Genus: Melieria
- Species: M. pulicaria

Binomial name
- Melieria pulicaria (Robineau-Desvoidy, 1830)

Species of fly

Melieria pulicaria is a species of ulidiid or picture-winged fly in the genus Melieria of the family Ulidiidae.
