= Phaeosoma nigricorne =

Scientific classification
- Kingdom: Animalia
- Phylum: Arthropoda
- Class: Insecta
- Order: Diptera
- Family: Ulidiidae
- Genus: Phaeosoma
- Species: P. nigricorne

Binomial name
- Phaeosoma nigricorne Becker, 1907

Species of fly

Phaeosoma nigricorne is a species of picture-winged fly in the family Ulidiidae.
