= Phaeosoma atricorne =

Scientific classification
- Kingdom: Animalia
- Phylum: Arthropoda
- Class: Insecta
- Order: Diptera
- Family: Ulidiidae
- Genus: Phaeosoma
- Species: P. atricorne

Binomial name
- Phaeosoma atricorne (Mik, 1885)

Synonyms
- Hypochra atricornis Mik, 1885; Melieria atricornis (Mik, 1885)

Species of fly

Phaeosoma atricorne is a species of picture-winged fly in the family Ulidiidae.
