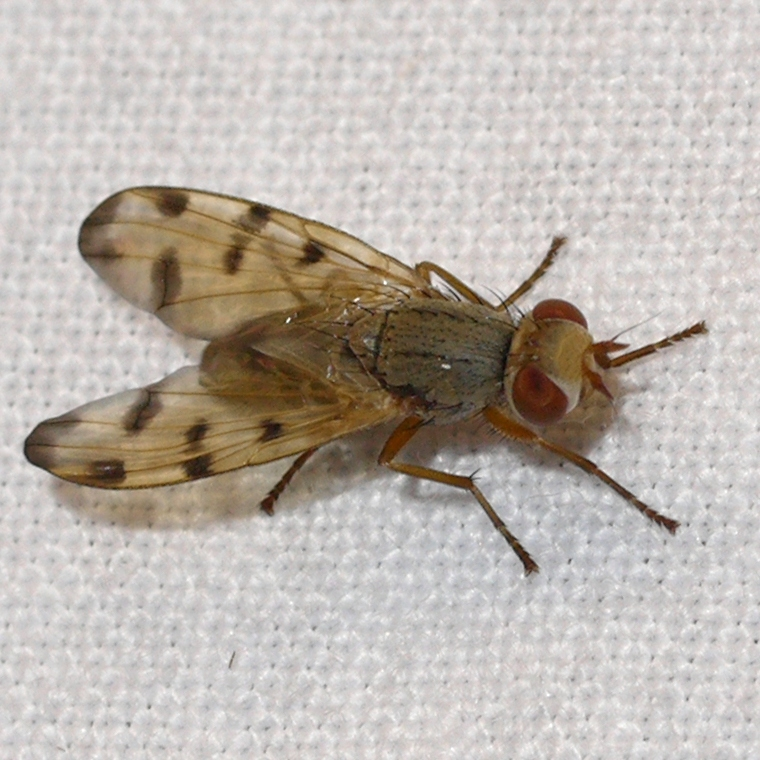

Scientific classification
- Kingdom: Animalia
- Phylum: Arthropoda
- Class: Insecta
- Order: Diptera
- Family: Ulidiidae
- Genus: Melieria
- Species: M. ochricornis

Binomial name
- Melieria ochricornis (Loew, 1873)

Synonyms
- Ceroxys ochricornis Loew, 1873

= Melieria ochricornis =

Species of fly

Melieria ochricornis is a species of picture-winged fly in the family Ulidiidae.
