= Hypochra asiatica =

Scientific classification
- Kingdom: Animalia
- Phylum: Arthropoda
- Clade: Pancrustacea
- Class: Insecta
- Order: Diptera
- Family: Ulidiidae
- Subfamily: Otitinae
- Genus: Hypochra
- Species: H. asiatica

Binomial name
- Hypochra asiatica Hennig, 1939

Species of fly

Hypochra asiatica is a species of Picture-winged Fly in the family Ulidiidae.
