= Melieria limpidipennis =

Scientific classification
- Kingdom: Animalia
- Phylum: Arthropoda
- Class: Insecta
- Order: Diptera
- Family: Ulidiidae
- Genus: Melieria
- Species: M. limpidipennis

Binomial name
- Melieria limpidipennis Becker, 1907

Species of fly

Melieria limpidipennis is a species of ulidiid or picture-winged fly in the family Ulidiidae. It was originally collected from Chinese Turkestan.
