= Melieria rubella =

Scientific classification
- Kingdom: Animalia
- Phylum: Arthropoda
- Clade: Pancrustacea
- Class: Insecta
- Order: Diptera
- Family: Ulidiidae
- Genus: Melieria
- Species: M. rubella

Binomial name
- Melieria rubella Robineau-Desvoidy, 1830

Species of fly

Melieria rubella is a species fly in the genus Melieria of the family Ulidiidae.
