= Phaeosoma mongolicum =

Scientific classification
- Kingdom: Animalia
- Phylum: Arthropoda
- Class: Insecta
- Order: Diptera
- Family: Ulidiidae
- Genus: Phaeosoma
- Species: P. mongolicum

Binomial name
- Phaeosoma mongolicum Soós, 1971

Species of fly

Phaeosoma mongolicum is a species of picture-winged fly in the family Ulidiidae.
