= Melieria picta =

Scientific classification
- Kingdom: Animalia
- Phylum: Arthropoda
- Clade: Pancrustacea
- Class: Insecta
- Order: Diptera
- Family: Ulidiidae
- Genus: Melieria
- Species: M. picta

Binomial name
- Melieria picta (Meigen, 1826)

Synonyms
- Ortalis picta Meigen, 1826; Ortalis quinquenotata Meigen, 1838; Ceroxys quinquemaculata Macquart, 1835

Species of fly

Melieria picta is a species of fly in the family Ulidiidae. It is widespread in Europe.
