= Melieria unicolor =

Scientific classification
- Kingdom: Animalia
- Phylum: Arthropoda
- Class: Insecta
- Order: Diptera
- Family: Ulidiidae
- Genus: Melieria
- Species: M. unicolor

Binomial name
- Melieria unicolor (Loew, 1854)

Synonyms
- Ortalis unicolor Loew, 1854

Species of fly

Melierie unicolor is a species of ulidiid or picture-winger fly in the genus Melierie of the family Ulidae.
