= Phaeosoma griseicolle =

Scientific classification
- Kingdom: Animalia
- Phylum: Arthropoda
- Class: Insecta
- Order: Diptera
- Family: Ulidiidae
- Genus: Phaeosoma
- Species: P. griseicolle

Binomial name
- Phaeosoma griseicolle (Becker, 1907)

Synonyms
- Meckelia griseicolle Becker, 1907

Species of fly

Phaeosoma griseicolle is a species of picture-winged fly in the family Ulidiidae.
