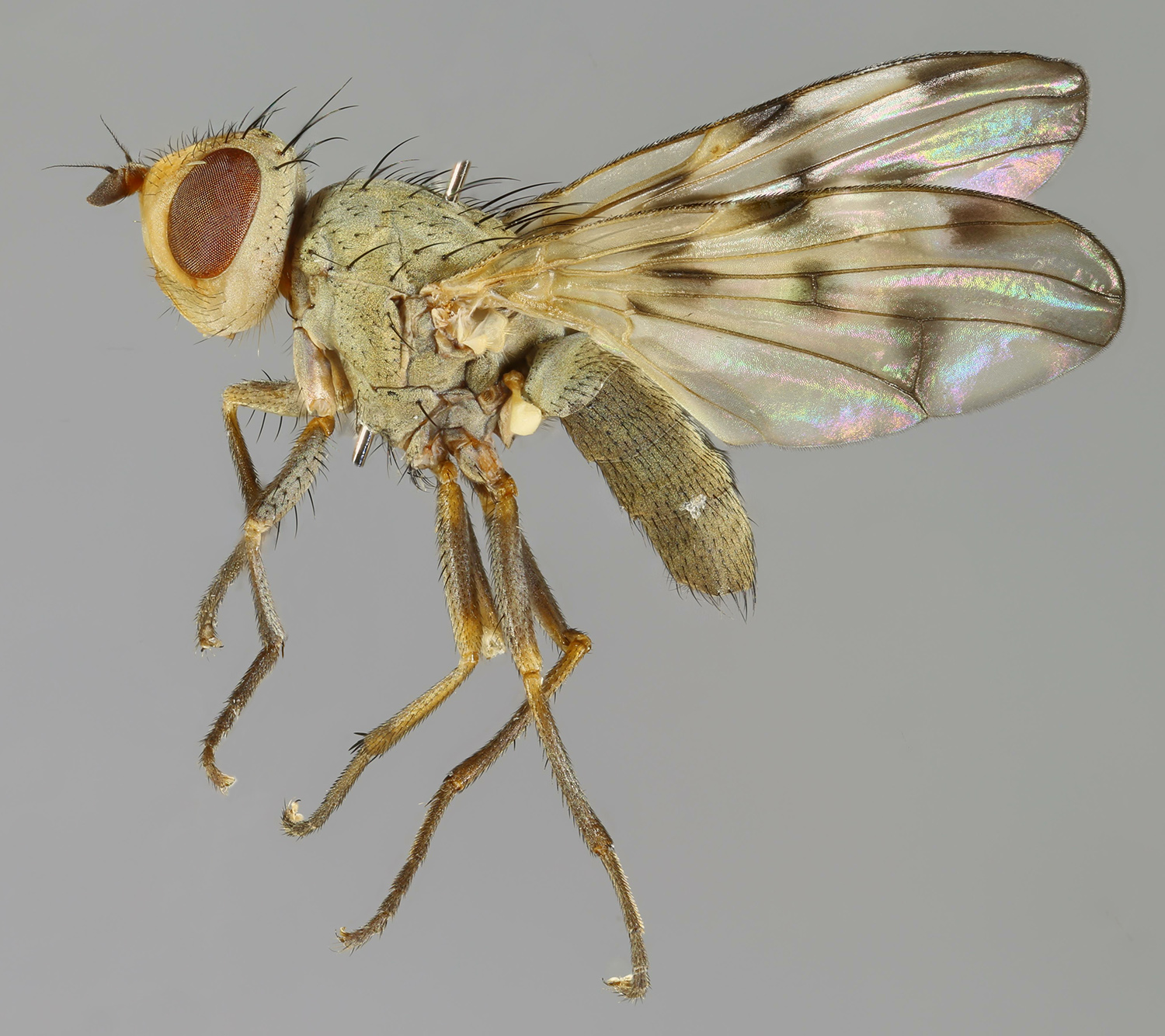

Scientific classification
- Kingdom: Animalia
- Phylum: Arthropoda
- Class: Insecta
- Order: Diptera
- Family: Ulidiidae
- Genus: Melieria
- Species: M. cana

Binomial name
- Melieria cana (Loew, 1858)

Synonyms
- Ortalis cana Loew, 1858; Melieria egena (Pandellé, 1902); Ortalis egena Pandellé, 1902; Ceroxys obscuricornis Loew, 1873

= Melieria cana =

Species of insect

Melieria cana is a species of ulidiid or picture-winged fly in the genus Melieria of the family Ulidiidae. They are found around the coast of England.
