= Melieria immaculata =

Scientific classification
- Kingdom: Animalia
- Phylum: Arthropoda
- Class: Insecta
- Order: Diptera
- Family: Ulidiidae
- Genus: Melieria
- Species: M. immaculata

Binomial name
- Melieria immaculata Becker, 1907

Species of fly

Melieria immaculata is a species of ulidiid or picture-winged fly in the genus Melieria of the family Tephritidae.
