= Melieria sabuleti =

Scientific classification
- Kingdom: Animalia
- Phylum: Arthropoda
- Clade: Pancrustacea
- Class: Insecta
- Order: Diptera
- Family: Ulidiidae
- Genus: Melieria
- Species: M. sabuleti

Binomial name
- Melieria sabuleti Steyskal, 1962

Species of fly

Melieria sabuleti is a species of ulidiid or picture-winged fly in the genus Melieria of the family Ulidiidae.
