= Melieria felis =

Scientific classification
- Kingdom: Animalia
- Phylum: Arthropoda
- Class: Insecta
- Order: Diptera
- Family: Ulidiidae
- Genus: Melieria
- Species: M. felis

Binomial name
- Melieria felis Kameneva, 1996

Species of fly

Melieria felis is a species of ulidiid or picture-winged fly in the genus Melieria of the family Ulidiidae.
