= Phaeosoma obscuricornis =

Scientific classification
- Kingdom: Animalia
- Phylum: Arthropoda
- Clade: Pancrustacea
- Class: Insecta
- Order: Diptera
- Family: Ulidiidae
- Genus: Phaeosoma
- Species: P. obscuricornis

Binomial name
- Phaeosoma obscuricornis (Becker, 1907)

Synonyms
- Melieria obscuricornis Becker, 1907

Species of fly

Phaeosoma obscuricornis is a species of fly in the genus Phaeosoma of the family Ulidiidae.
