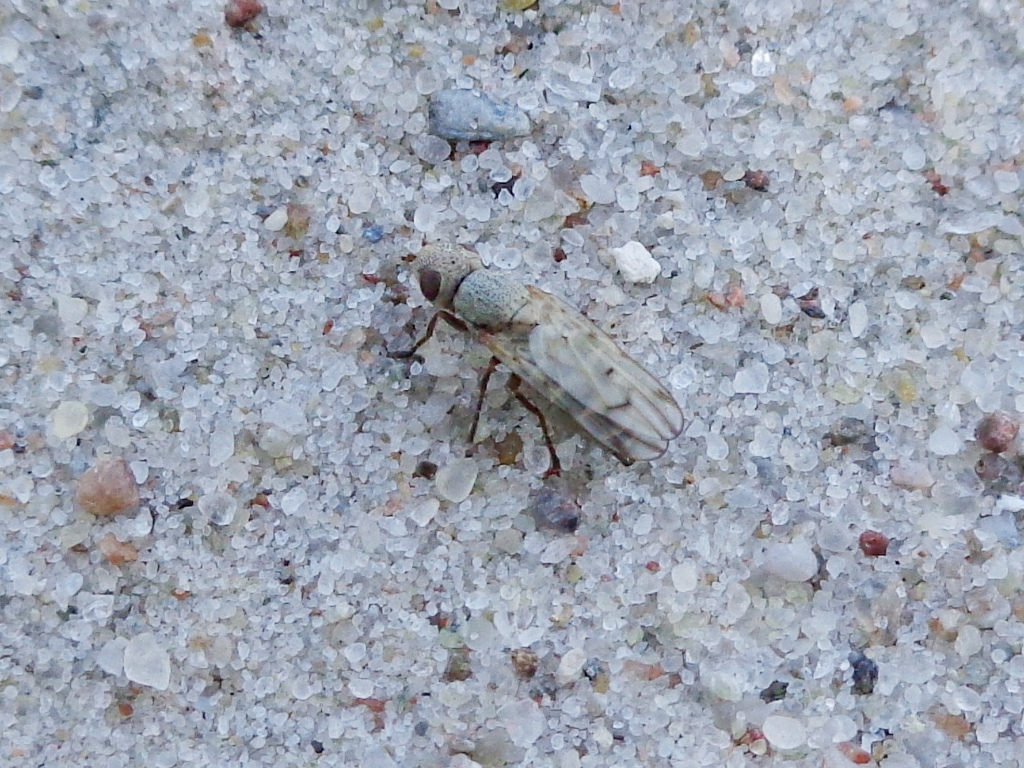

Scientific classification
- Kingdom: Animalia
- Phylum: Arthropoda
- Class: Insecta
- Order: Diptera
- Family: Ulidiidae
- Genus: Melieria
- Species: M. omissa

Binomial name
- Melieria omissa (Meigen, 1826)

Synonyms
- Ortalis omissa Meigen, 1826; Melieria misrica Steyskal, 1968

= Melieria omissa =

Species of fly

Melieria omissa is a small fly that is commonly found in wet, marshy vegetation in May. Scientists think that the dagger-like ovipositor of the females might be used for inserting eggs into vegetation.

== Distribution ==
M. omissa has been documented across Eurasia, from Great Britain to Korea, and as far south as Italy, Greece and the Arabian Peninsula.
