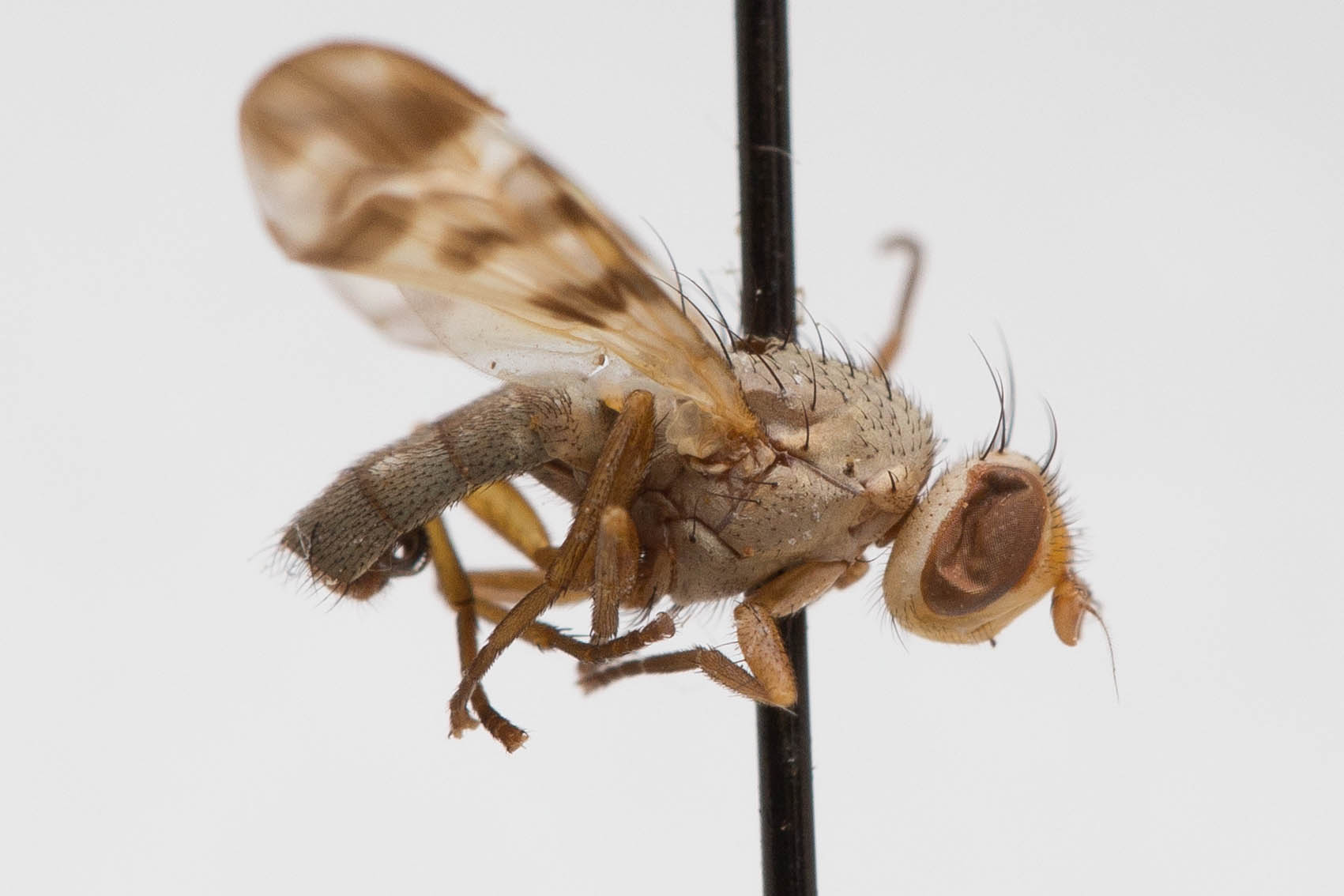

Scientific classification
- Kingdom: Animalia
- Phylum: Arthropoda
- Class: Insecta
- Order: Diptera
- Family: Ulidiidae
- Genus: Melieria
- Species: M. occidentalis

Binomial name
- Melieria occidentalis Coquillett, 1904

= Melieria occidentalis =

Species of fly

Melieria occidentalis is a species of ulidiid or picture-winged fly in the genus Melieria of the family Ulidiidae.
