= Melieria similis =

Scientific classification
- Kingdom: Animalia
- Phylum: Arthropoda
- Class: Insecta
- Order: Diptera
- Family: Ulidiidae
- Genus: Melieria
- Species: M. similis

Binomial name
- Melieria similis (Loew, 1873)

Synonyms
- Ceroxys similis Loew, 1873

Species of fly

Melieria similis is a species of fly in the genus Melieria of the family Ulidiidae.
