= Melieria theodori =

Scientific classification
- Kingdom: Animalia
- Phylum: Arthropoda
- Class: Insecta
- Order: Diptera
- Family: Ulidiidae
- Genus: Melieria
- Species: M. theodori

Binomial name
- Melieria theodori Kameneva, 2000

Species of fly

Melieria theodori is a species of ulidiid or picture-winged fly in the genus Melieria of the family Ulidiidae.
