= Melieria acuticornis =

Scientific classification
- Kingdom: Animalia
- Phylum: Arthropoda
- Class: Insecta
- Order: Diptera
- Family: Ulidiidae
- Genus: Melieria
- Species: M. acuticornis

Binomial name
- Melieria acuticornis (Loew, 1854)

Synonyms
- Ortalis acuticornis Loew, 1854

Species of fly

Melieria acuticornis is a species of picture-winged fly in the family Ulidiidae.
