= Hypochra =

Scientific classification
- Domain: Eukaryota
- Kingdom: Animalia
- Phylum: Arthropoda
- Class: Insecta
- Order: Diptera
- Family: Ulidiidae
- Subfamily: Otitinae
- Genus: Hypochra; Loew, 1868

Genus of flies

Hypochra is a genus of Picture-winged Flies in the family Ulidiidae. There are about five described species in Hypochra.

== Species ==
These five species belong to the genus Hypochra:

- Hypochra albipennis (Loew, 1846)
- Hypochra albufera Lyneborg, 1969
- Hypochra asiatica Hennig, 1939
- Hypochra flexa Wang, 1996
- Hypochra parmensis (Rondani, 1869)
