= Phaeosoma =

Scientific classification
- Kingdom: Animalia
- Phylum: Arthropoda
- Clade: Pancrustacea
- Class: Insecta
- Order: Diptera
- Family: Ulidiidae
- Subfamily: Otitinae
- Genus: Phaeosoma; Becker, 1907

Genus of flies

Phaeosoma is a genus of picture-winged flies in the family Ulidiidae. There are about five described species in Phaeosoma.

== Species ==
These five species belong to the genus Phaeosoma:

- Phaeosoma atricorne (Mik, 1885)
- Phaeosoma griseicolle (Becker, 1907)
- Phaeosoma mongolicum Soós, 1971
- Phaeosoma nigricorne Becker, 1907
- Phaeosoma obscuricornis (Becker, 1907)
