= Hypochra albufera =

Scientific classification
- Kingdom: Animalia
- Phylum: Arthropoda
- Class: Insecta
- Order: Diptera
- Family: Ulidiidae
- Subfamily: Otitinae
- Genus: Hypochra
- Species: H. albufera

Binomial name
- Hypochra albufera Lyneborg, 1969

Synonyms
- Melieria albufera (Lyneborg, 1969)

Species of fly

Hypochra albufera is a species of Picture-winged Fly in the family Ulidiidae.
