= Hypochra albipennis =

Scientific classification
- Domain: Eukaryota
- Kingdom: Animalia
- Phylum: Arthropoda
- Class: Insecta
- Order: Diptera
- Family: Ulidiidae
- Subfamily: Otitinae
- Genus: Hypochra
- Species: H. albipennis

Binomial name
- Hypochra albipennis (Loew, 1846)

Synonyms
- Melieria albipennis (Loew, 1846); Ortalis albipennis Loew, 1846

Species of fly

Hypochra albipennis is a species of ulidiid or picture-winged fly in the genus Hypochra of the family Ulidiidae.

They have been observed in and around Oslo.
