= Alternans =

Alternans may refer to:

== Species ==
- Scolopendra alternans
- Philodes alternans
- Aedes alternans
- Mecaspis alternans
- Brachinus alternans
- Anorostoma alternans
- Trochalus alternans
- Raphitoma alternans
- Dipsas alternans
- Stachybotrys alternans
- Physocarpus alternans
- Euxesta alternans
- Pangio alternans
- Sternotomis alternans
- Omorgus alternans
- Cryptocephalus alternans
- Calosoma alternans
- Melanothrix alternans
- Anisodactylus alternans
- Oligomerus alternans
- Trachyphloeus alternans
- Sybra alternans
- Cremnosterna alternans
- Agapanthia alternans
- Egira alternans
- Lilium alternans
- Chelymorpha alternans
- Mastax alternans
- Hypogeophis alternans
- Ophiocoma alternans
- Onychylis alternans
- Kessleria alternans
- Temnostoma alternans
- Pachycnema alternans
- Comaserica alternans
- Protichnites alternans
- Clivina alternans
- Platychelus alternans
- Aegina alternans
- Sybra alternans m. discomaculata
- Orthogonius alternans
- Cephaloleia alternans
- Mycotretus alternans
- Aulacoserica alternans
- Autoserica alternans
- Paratritania alternans
- Saimia alternans

== Other ==
- Pulsus alternans
- Electrical alternans
- T wave alternans
- Hemiphlegia alternans
