= Pachycnema saga =

Scientific classification
- Kingdom: Animalia
- Phylum: Arthropoda
- Class: Insecta
- Order: Coleoptera
- Suborder: Polyphaga
- Infraorder: Scarabaeiformia
- Family: Scarabaeidae
- Genus: Pachycnema
- Species: P. saga

Binomial name
- Pachycnema saga Péringuey, 1902

Species of beetle

Pachycnema saga is a species of beetle of the family Scarabaeidae. It is found in South Africa (Northern Cape, Western Cape).

== Description ==
Adults reach a length of about 9–10 mm (0.35–0.39 in). They are similar to Pachycnema namaqua and Pachycnema lineola, but a little more elongated. The head and pronotum are similar in shape and sculpture, but there is a distinct longitudinal groove in the middle, and as often as not a marginal band all round of flavescent scales in both sexes. The scutellum, which is narrower and slightly shorter than in the other two species, is covered with scales, but the elytra, which are ochraceous yellow, are without any in both sexes, and have on each side three discoidal as well as a sutural and an outer marginal row of long, black setae. The pygidium is covered with white scales in males, while these are yellow in females.
