= Pachycnema tibialis =

Scientific classification
- Kingdom: Animalia
- Phylum: Arthropoda
- Clade: Pancrustacea
- Class: Insecta
- Order: Coleoptera
- Suborder: Polyphaga
- Infraorder: Scarabaeiformia
- Family: Scarabaeidae
- Genus: Pachycnema
- Species: P. tibialis

Binomial name
- Pachycnema tibialis (Olivier, 1789)

Synonyms
- Melolontha tibialis Olivier, 1789

Species of beetle

Pachycnema tibialis is a species of beetle of the family Scarabaeidae. It is found in South Africa (Western Cape, Eastern Cape).

== Description ==
Adults reach a length of about 8–9 mm (0.31–0.35 in). They are very similar to Pachycnema marginella and Pachycnema moerens in shape and sculpture, but the elytra are lighter brick red, and occasionally they are narrowly infuscate along the outer margin. Furthermore, the scales on the propygidium and pygidium are whiter in males, and there is no trace of scales on the discoidal part of the pronotum, and they are even as often as not obliterated along the outer margins in both sexes. The most distinctive character consists of the very long and dense villosity covering the pronotum, and the longer but less dense black or flavescent bristly hairs clothing the elytra. In most females, there are some very fine, appressed yellowish but closely set scales on the elytra.
