= Comaserica hildebrandti =

Scientific classification
- Kingdom: Animalia
- Phylum: Arthropoda
- Class: Insecta
- Order: Coleoptera
- Suborder: Polyphaga
- Infraorder: Scarabaeiformia
- Family: Scarabaeidae
- Genus: Comaserica
- Species: C. hildebrandti

Binomial name
- Comaserica hildebrandti Brenske, 1900

Species of beetle

Comaserica hildebrandti is a species of beetle of the family Scarabaeidae. It is found in Madagascar.

== Description ==
Adults reach a length of about 7 mm. They are very similar to Comaserica bouvieri, but the antennae are shorter, the pronotum is longer and the hind femora are more robust. The pronotum is distinctly wider transversely towards the rear. It is greenish shimmering with a few white setae. The elytra are heavily spotted, with larger dark spots on the alternately raised ribs and smaller spots in between. The pygidium is sparsely setate. The underside is pruinose, as are the hind femora.
