= Pachycnema nubila =

Scientific classification
- Kingdom: Animalia
- Phylum: Arthropoda
- Class: Insecta
- Order: Coleoptera
- Suborder: Polyphaga
- Infraorder: Scarabaeiformia
- Family: Scarabaeidae
- Genus: Pachycnema
- Species: P. nubila

Binomial name
- Pachycnema nubila Schein, 1959

Species of beetle

Pachycnema nubila is a species of beetle of the family Scarabaeidae. It is found in South Africa (Western Cape, Northern Cape).

== Description ==
Adults reach a length of about 8–9 mm (0.31–0.35 in). They are very similar to Pachycnema danieli, but the scales on the elytra are different. They are black, with the elytra and usually also the legs reddish-brown. The pronotum has a light margin of scales and yellowish hair-like scales. The scutellum is densely covered with whitish scales.
