= Aulacoserica flava =

Scientific classification
- Kingdom: Animalia
- Phylum: Arthropoda
- Clade: Pancrustacea
- Class: Insecta
- Order: Coleoptera
- Suborder: Polyphaga
- Infraorder: Scarabaeiformia
- Family: Scarabaeidae
- Genus: Aulacoserica
- Species: A. flava

Binomial name
- Aulacoserica flava Brenske, 1902

Species of beetle

Aulacoserica flava is a species of beetle of the family Scarabaeidae. It is found in Tanzania.

== Description ==
Adults reach a length of about 5.5 mm. They are very similar to Aulacoserica facilis, but somewhat smaller. The pronotum and elytra are somewhat more convex, the latter densely but duller punctate in the interstices, the abdomen is more strongly constricted.
