= Comaserica dapsilis =

Scientific classification
- Kingdom: Animalia
- Phylum: Arthropoda
- Class: Insecta
- Order: Coleoptera
- Suborder: Polyphaga
- Infraorder: Scarabaeiformia
- Family: Scarabaeidae
- Genus: Comaserica
- Species: C. dapsilis

Binomial name
- Comaserica dapsilis Brenske, 1899

Species of beetle

Comaserica dapsilis is a species of beetle of the family Scarabaeidae. It is found in Madagascar.

== Description ==
Adults reach a length of about 7 mm. They are very similar to Comaserica crinita, but smaller and narrower. Furthermore, the clypeus is densely wrinkled and punctate and slightly raised in the middle. The setae are present, but indistinct. The pronotal margin is densely setate but less curved. On the elytra, the first stria is somewhat weaker than the others along almost its entire length and the lateral margin is less densely setate.
