= Aulacoserica stuhlmanni =

Scientific classification
- Kingdom: Animalia
- Phylum: Arthropoda
- Class: Insecta
- Order: Coleoptera
- Suborder: Polyphaga
- Infraorder: Scarabaeiformia
- Family: Scarabaeidae
- Genus: Aulacoserica
- Species: A. stuhlmanni

Binomial name
- Aulacoserica stuhlmanni Brenske, 1902

Species of beetle

Aulacoserica stuhlmanni is a species of beetle of the family Scarabaeidae. It is found in the Democratic Republic of the Congo.

== Description ==
Adults reach a length of about 5.5 mm. Adults are similar to Aulacoserica nyansana, but the notch on the lateral margin of the clypeus is somewhat more pronounced. On the elytra, the intervals are somewhat more convex, the punctures of the striae are less distinct, and those of the intervals are not as sharp.
