= Aulacoserica rufocastanea =

Scientific classification
- Kingdom: Animalia
- Phylum: Arthropoda
- Clade: Pancrustacea
- Class: Insecta
- Order: Coleoptera
- Suborder: Polyphaga
- Infraorder: Scarabaeiformia
- Family: Scarabaeidae
- Genus: Aulacoserica
- Species: A. rufocastanea

Binomial name
- Aulacoserica rufocastanea Moser, 1924

Species of beetle

Aulacoserica rufocastanea is a species of beetle of the family Scarabaeidae. It is found in the Democratic Republic of the Congo.

== Description ==
Adults reach a length of about 5.5 mm (0.22 in). They are similar to Aulacoserica castanea. They are chestnut brown and glossy, with the head closely punctate and with reddish antennae. The scutellum is closely punctulate and the elytra have rows of punctures, with the interstices flat and covered with fairly dense punctures. The pygidium is moderately densely punctate.
