= Pachycnema pulverulenta =

Scientific classification
- Kingdom: Animalia
- Phylum: Arthropoda
- Class: Insecta
- Order: Coleoptera
- Suborder: Polyphaga
- Infraorder: Scarabaeiformia
- Family: Scarabaeidae
- Genus: Pachycnema
- Species: P. pulverulenta

Binomial name
- Pachycnema pulverulenta Burmeister, 1844

Species of beetle

Pachycnema pulverulenta is a species of beetle of the family Scarabaeidae. It is found in South Africa (Western Cape, Eastern Cape).

== Description ==
Adults reach a length of about 8.5–9 mm (0.33–0.35 in). They are similar to Pachycnema crassipes, but the elytra are reddish brown in both sexes, and the hind legs of the male are black, although some males have red legs. There are no scales on the pronotum, along the outer margin, or on the disk.
