= Aulacoserica konduensis =

Scientific classification
- Kingdom: Animalia
- Phylum: Arthropoda
- Clade: Pancrustacea
- Class: Insecta
- Order: Coleoptera
- Suborder: Polyphaga
- Infraorder: Scarabaeiformia
- Family: Scarabaeidae
- Genus: Aulacoserica
- Species: A. konduensis

Binomial name
- Aulacoserica konduensis Moser, 1919

Species of beetle

Aulacoserica konduensis is a species of beetle of the family Scarabaeidae. It is found in the Democratic Republic of the Congo.

== Description ==
Adults reach a length of about 6.5 mm. They are reddish-brown and glossy and are very similar in colour and shape to Aulacoserica castanea, but differs in its significantly broader hind femora. The latter are very strongly broadened, their posterior margin is very slightly indented, and at the end are two setae. The hind tibiae are broad and short, the fore tibiae are bidentate.
