= Comaserica setosicollis =

Scientific classification
- Kingdom: Animalia
- Phylum: Arthropoda
- Class: Insecta
- Order: Coleoptera
- Suborder: Polyphaga
- Infraorder: Scarabaeiformia
- Family: Scarabaeidae
- Genus: Comaserica
- Species: C. setosicollis

Binomial name
- Comaserica setosicollis (Blanchard, 1850)

Synonyms
- Emphania setosicollis Blanchard, 1850

Species of beetle

Comaserica setosicollis is a species of beetle of the family Scarabaeidae. It is found in Madagascar.

== Description ==
Adults reach a length of about 8 mm. They are very similar to Comaserica irrorata, but the pronotum is more densely covered with setae and the elytra have nine furrows.
