= Aulacoserica schoutedeni =

Scientific classification
- Kingdom: Animalia
- Phylum: Arthropoda
- Clade: Pancrustacea
- Class: Insecta
- Order: Coleoptera
- Suborder: Polyphaga
- Infraorder: Scarabaeiformia
- Family: Scarabaeidae
- Genus: Aulacoserica
- Species: A. schoutedeni

Binomial name
- Aulacoserica schoutedeni Moser, 1924

Species of beetle

Aulacoserica schoutedeni is a species of beetle of the family Scarabaeidae. It is found in the Democratic Republic of the Congo.

== Description ==
Adults reach a length of about 7 mm (0.28 in). They are similar to Aulacoserica castanea. They are chestnut brown and glossy, with the head rather strongly and densely punctured. The antennae are reddish. The scutellum is punctured, except in the center and the elytra have rows of punctures, with the intervals flat and covered with rather dense punctures. The pygidium is rather coarsely punctured. The underside is finely punctured in the middle, but more strongly at the sides.
