= Comaserica tessellata =

Scientific classification
- Kingdom: Animalia
- Phylum: Arthropoda
- Class: Insecta
- Order: Coleoptera
- Suborder: Polyphaga
- Infraorder: Scarabaeiformia
- Family: Scarabaeidae
- Genus: Comaserica
- Species: C. tessellata

Binomial name
- Comaserica tessellata (Klug, 1834)

Synonyms
- Serica tessellata Klug, 1834

Species of beetle

Comaserica tessellata is a species of beetle of the family Scarabaeidae. It is found in Madagascar.

== Description ==
Adults reach a length of about 5 mm. They are most similar to Comaserica bergrothi, but slightly smaller. They are dull, slightly opalescent, spotted on the elytra and yellowish-brown underneath. The frons is partly shiny, finely punctate, with two setae behind the suture. The pronotum is only slightly transverse, almost elongate, the posterior angles broadly rounded, scarcely projecting anteriorly in the middle, and punctate with scattered setae. The scutellum is small, finely and thinly covered with white hairs. The elytra are furrowed, the furrows as wide as the slightly raised ribs, slightly dark-spotted, with a few white setae.
