= Comaserica simillima =

Scientific classification
- Kingdom: Animalia
- Phylum: Arthropoda
- Class: Insecta
- Order: Coleoptera
- Suborder: Polyphaga
- Infraorder: Scarabaeiformia
- Family: Scarabaeidae
- Genus: Comaserica
- Species: C. simillima

Binomial name
- Comaserica simillima Brenske, 1899

Species of beetle

Comaserica simillima is a species of beetle of the family Scarabaeidae. It is found in Madagascar.

== Description ==
Adults reach a length of about 8–9 mm. They are very similar to Comaserica irrorata, but the frons is shiny behind the suture and coarsely punctate with setae. The secondary ribs on the elytra are even weaker than in C. irrorata and the pygidium is narrower, smooth at the apex, punctate towards the base, and without distinct setate punctures.
