= Comaserica aurita =

Scientific classification
- Kingdom: Animalia
- Phylum: Arthropoda
- Clade: Pancrustacea
- Class: Insecta
- Order: Coleoptera
- Suborder: Polyphaga
- Infraorder: Scarabaeiformia
- Family: Scarabaeidae
- Genus: Comaserica
- Species: C. aurita

Binomial name
- Comaserica aurita Brenske, 1900

Species of beetle

Comaserica aurita is a species of beetle of the family Scarabaeidae. It is found in Madagascar.

== Description ==
Adults reach a length of about 4 mm. They are similar to Comaserica discolor. The frons is greenish metallic and somewhat sparsely punctate. The posterior angles of the pronotum are broadly rounded, somewhat less so than in C. discolor, and the posterior margin is not projecting in the middle, but is evenly rounded. The elytra are deeply punctate and striate. All striations are symmetrical. They are generally somewhat yellowish-brown and opalescent. The underside is only weakly silky.
