= Pachycnema calviniana =

Scientific classification
- Kingdom: Animalia
- Phylum: Arthropoda
- Class: Insecta
- Order: Coleoptera
- Suborder: Polyphaga
- Infraorder: Scarabaeiformia
- Family: Scarabaeidae
- Genus: Pachycnema
- Species: P. calviniana

Binomial name
- Pachycnema calviniana Schein, 1959

Species of beetle

Pachycnema calviniana is a species of beetle of the family Scarabaeidae. It is found in South Africa (Western Cape, Northern Cape).

== Description ==
Adults reach a length of about 6–9 mm (0.24–0.35 in). They are black and similar to Pachycnema singularis, with similar white-speckled elytra. In this species, the black colour of the elytra and legs sometimes has a brownish tint.
