= Aulacoserica grandis =

Scientific classification
- Kingdom: Animalia
- Phylum: Arthropoda
- Clade: Pancrustacea
- Class: Insecta
- Order: Coleoptera
- Suborder: Polyphaga
- Infraorder: Scarabaeiformia
- Family: Scarabaeidae
- Genus: Aulacoserica
- Species: A. grandis

Binomial name
- Aulacoserica grandis Moser, 1918

Species of beetle

Aulacoserica grandis is a species of beetle of the family Scarabaeidae. It is found in Cameroon.

== Description ==
Adults reach a length of about 11–12 mm. They are brown and shiny. The frons is rather sparsely punctured and the antennae are yellowish-brown. The pronotum is rather densely punctate and the elytra have rows of punctures, with the intervals shallow and somewhat more widely spaced than the pronotum.
