= Aulacoserica kaszabi =

Scientific classification
- Kingdom: Animalia
- Phylum: Arthropoda
- Class: Insecta
- Order: Coleoptera
- Suborder: Polyphaga
- Infraorder: Scarabaeiformia
- Family: Scarabaeidae
- Genus: Aulacoserica
- Species: A. kaszabi

Binomial name
- Aulacoserica kaszabi Frey, 1968

Species of beetle

Aulacoserica kaszabi is a species of beetle of the family Scarabaeidae. It is found in the Republic of the Congo.

== Description ==
Adults reach a length of about 5 mm. The upper and lower surfaces are shiny blackish-brown. The pronotum is moderately finely and densely punctate, while the elytra is covered with slightly less dense punctation, arranged in rows.
