= Pachycnema melanospila =

Scientific classification
- Kingdom: Animalia
- Phylum: Arthropoda
- Class: Insecta
- Order: Coleoptera
- Suborder: Polyphaga
- Infraorder: Scarabaeiformia
- Family: Scarabaeidae
- Genus: Pachycnema
- Species: P. melanospila

Binomial name
- Pachycnema melanospila Burmeister, 1844

Species of beetle

Pachycnema melanospila is a species of beetle of the family Scarabaeidae. It is found in South Africa (Western Cape).

== Description ==
Adults reach a length of about 9 mm (0.35 in). The head and pronotum are black and covered with dense fuscous hairs interspersed with moderately dense somewhat flavescent hair-like appressed scales. The elytra are dark chestnut (almost bordering on fuscous) brown, and are covered with ashy-grey scales, and having on each side one distinct median blackish round spot and another one somewhat indistinct. The legs are piceous and the pygidium is covered with yellow scales.
