= Pachycnema flavolineata =

Scientific classification
- Kingdom: Animalia
- Phylum: Arthropoda
- Class: Insecta
- Order: Coleoptera
- Suborder: Polyphaga
- Infraorder: Scarabaeiformia
- Family: Scarabaeidae
- Genus: Pachycnema
- Species: P. flavolineata

Binomial name
- Pachycnema flavolineata Burmeister, 1844

Species of beetle

Pachycnema flavolineata is a species of beetle of the family Scarabaeidae. It is found in South Africa (Northern Cape).

== Description ==
Adults reach a length of about 9–10 mm (0.35–0.39 in). The head and pronotum are black, clothed with long black hairs, narrowly marginate all round with white scales in males and yellow ones in females, and having in the median part of the disk four equidistant patches of scales disposed transversely. The elytra are livid brown in males, and sub-ochraceous in females, having on each side a sutural and a supra-marginal band connecting along the apical part, and a discoidal one reaching from the base to past the middle and composed of appressed, lanceolate scales, which are white in males and yellow in females. The pygidium is entirely covered with dense round scales.
