= Pachycnema ulrichi =

Scientific classification
- Kingdom: Animalia
- Phylum: Arthropoda
- Clade: Pancrustacea
- Class: Insecta
- Order: Coleoptera
- Suborder: Polyphaga
- Infraorder: Scarabaeiformia
- Family: Scarabaeidae
- Genus: Pachycnema
- Species: P. ulrichi

Binomial name
- Pachycnema ulrichi Dombrow, 1998

Species of beetle

Pachycnema ulrichi is a species of beetle of the family Scarabaeidae. It is found in South Africa (Northern Cape).
