= Aulacoserica antennalis =

Scientific classification
- Kingdom: Animalia
- Phylum: Arthropoda
- Clade: Pancrustacea
- Class: Insecta
- Order: Coleoptera
- Suborder: Polyphaga
- Infraorder: Scarabaeiformia
- Family: Scarabaeidae
- Genus: Aulacoserica
- Species: A. antennalis

Binomial name
- Aulacoserica antennalis Moser, 1924

Species of beetle

Aulacoserica antennalis is a species of beetle of the family Scarabaeidae. It is found in Tanzania.

== Description ==
Adults reach a length of about 6 mm. They are light reddish-yellow. The antennae are reddish-yellow.
