= Comaserica mocquerysi =

Scientific classification
- Kingdom: Animalia
- Phylum: Arthropoda
- Class: Insecta
- Order: Coleoptera
- Suborder: Polyphaga
- Infraorder: Scarabaeiformia
- Family: Scarabaeidae
- Genus: Comaserica
- Species: C. mocquerysi

Binomial name
- Comaserica mocquerysi Brenske, 1900

Species of beetle

Comaserica mocquerysi is a species of beetle of the family Scarabaeidae. It is found in Madagascar.

== Description ==
Adults reach a length of about 5 mm. They are small, dull and opalescent. The frons is shiny, very finely punctate, with two setae behind the suture. The pronotum is only slightly transverse, with shallow impressions and individual setae. It is greenish, with an almost metallic sheen. The scutellum is small and finely covered with white hairs. The elytra are densely spotted and has individual white setae.
