= Aulacoserica rosettae =

Scientific classification
- Kingdom: Animalia
- Phylum: Arthropoda
- Class: Insecta
- Order: Coleoptera
- Suborder: Polyphaga
- Infraorder: Scarabaeiformia
- Family: Scarabaeidae
- Genus: Aulacoserica
- Species: A. rosettae

Binomial name
- Aulacoserica rosettae Frey, 1968

Species of beetle

Aulacoserica rosettae is a species of beetle of the family Scarabaeidae. It is found in Guinea.

== Description ==
Adults reach a length of about 6–7 mm. The upper and lower surfaces are light reddish-brown. The pronotum is moderately and densely punctate, while the elytra are somewhat more finely and sparsely punctate.
