= Comaserica setosella =

Scientific classification
- Kingdom: Animalia
- Phylum: Arthropoda
- Clade: Pancrustacea
- Class: Insecta
- Order: Coleoptera
- Suborder: Polyphaga
- Infraorder: Scarabaeiformia
- Family: Scarabaeidae
- Genus: Comaserica
- Species: C. setosella

Binomial name
- Comaserica setosella Moser, 1911

Species of beetle

Comaserica setosella is a species of beetle of the family Scarabaeidae. It is found in Madagascar.

== Description ==
Adults reach a length of about 8 mm. They are brown, tomentose and faintly iridescent. The forehead is densely and coarsely punctate, with individual protruding setae. The pronotum is sparsely punctate and covered with yellow setae. The scutellum has bristle-bearing punctures along its lateral margins. The elytra have indistinct darker spots and are irregularly punctate. The setae arise from coarser punctures. The primary ribs are quite prominent.
