= Pachycnema murina =

Scientific classification
- Kingdom: Animalia
- Phylum: Arthropoda
- Class: Insecta
- Order: Coleoptera
- Suborder: Polyphaga
- Infraorder: Scarabaeiformia
- Family: Scarabaeidae
- Genus: Pachycnema
- Species: P. murina

Binomial name
- Pachycnema murina Burmeister, 1844

Species of beetle

Pachycnema murina is a species of beetle of the family Scarabaeidae. It is found in South Africa (Western Cape, Northern Cape).

== Description ==
The head and pronotum are black, the latter with a distinct marginal band of white scales and covered with others arranged somewhat in the shape of a cross and also having a scaly patch above and below the transverse arms of the cross on each side. The elytra are dull red, covered with not very closely set whitish-yellow scales, and having in addition five patches of dark ones on each side. The posterior legs are reddish. The head is clothed with greyish hairs.
