= Aulacoserica ghanaensis =

Scientific classification
- Kingdom: Animalia
- Phylum: Arthropoda
- Class: Insecta
- Order: Coleoptera
- Suborder: Polyphaga
- Infraorder: Scarabaeiformia
- Family: Scarabaeidae
- Genus: Aulacoserica
- Species: A. ghanaensis

Binomial name
- Aulacoserica ghanaensis Frey, 1974

Species of beetle

Aulacoserica ghanaensis is a species of beetle of the family Scarabaeidae. It is found in Ghana.

== Description ==
Adults reach a length of about 6–7 mm. The upper and lower surfaces are light reddish-brown (with the antennae yellow) and shiny. The pronotum is densely and finely punctate and the elytra have weakly impressed punctate striae.
