= Aulacoserica =

Scientific classification
- Kingdom: Animalia
- Phylum: Arthropoda
- Clade: Pancrustacea
- Class: Insecta
- Order: Coleoptera
- Suborder: Polyphaga
- Infraorder: Scarabaeiformia
- Family: Scarabaeidae
- Subfamily: Sericinae
- Tribe: Sericini
- Genus: Aulacoserica; Brenske, 1900

Genus of leaf beetles

Aulacoserica is a genus of beetles belonging to the family Scarabaeidae.

== Species ==
- Aulacoserica affinis Moser, 1918
- Aulacoserica alternans Frey, 1968
- Aulacoserica antennalis Moser, 1924
- Aulacoserica ardoini Frey, 1968
- Aulacoserica baraudi Frey, 1968
- Aulacoserica barbarae Frey, 1968
- Aulacoserica boeri Moser, 1917
- Aulacoserica bredoi Burgeon, 1943
- Aulacoserica brenskei Frey, 1968
- Aulacoserica castanea Moser, 1918
- Aulacoserica collarti Burgeon, 1943
- Aulacoserica colmanti Burgeon, 1943
- Aulacoserica crampelensis Moser, 1918
- Aulacoserica crassa Burgeon, 1943
- Aulacoserica dartevellei Burgeon, 1943
- Aulacoserica deremana Moser, 1918
- Aulacoserica diversicornis Frey, 1974
- Aulacoserica facilis Brenske, 1902
- Aulacoserica flava Brenske, 1902
- Aulacoserica fraterna Moser, 1918
- Aulacoserica gabonensis Frey, 1974
- Aulacoserica ghanaensis Frey, 1974
- Aulacoserica grandis Moser, 1918
- Aulacoserica guineensis Frey, 1968
- Aulacoserica haafi Frey, 1968
- Aulacoserica hexaphylla Frey, 1974
- Aulacoserica hulstaerti Burgeon, 1943
- Aulacoserica kaszabi Frey, 1968
- Aulacoserica konduensis Moser, 1919
- Aulacoserica kulzeri Frey, 1975
- Aulacoserica luluensis Burgeon, 1943
- Aulacoserica minima Burgeon, 1943
- Aulacoserica minor Frey, 1974
- Aulacoserica minuta Moser, 1918
- Aulacoserica moseri Frey, 1968
- Aulacoserica mulunguensis Burgeon, 1943
- Aulacoserica nimbana Frey, 1970
- Aulacoserica nyamlagirensis Burgeon, 1943
- Aulacoserica nyansana Brenske, 1902
- Aulacoserica overlaeti Burgeon, 1943
- Aulacoserica popoana Moser, 1918
- Aulacoserica pseudorufula Burgeon, 1943
- Aulacoserica puerilis Frey, 1968
- Aulacoserica pusilla Frey, 1968
- Aulacoserica pygmaea Moser, 1918
- Aulacoserica rosettae Frey, 1968
- Aulacoserica rufocastanea Moser, 1924
- Aulacoserica rufofusca Moser, 1918
- Aulacoserica schoutedeni Moser, 1924
- Aulacoserica schoutedeniana Burgeon, 1943
- Aulacoserica sibutensis Moser, 1917
- Aulacoserica soror Burgeon, 1943
- Aulacoserica stuhlmanni Brenske, 1902
- Aulacoserica subopaca Burgeon, 1943
- Aulacoserica tinanti Burgeon, 1943
- Aulacoserica tomentosa Frey, 1966
- Aulacoserica uelensis Burgeon, 1943
- Aulacoserica zumpti Frey, 1968
