= Comaserica decens =

Scientific classification
- Kingdom: Animalia
- Phylum: Arthropoda
- Class: Insecta
- Order: Coleoptera
- Suborder: Polyphaga
- Infraorder: Scarabaeiformia
- Family: Scarabaeidae
- Genus: Comaserica
- Species: C. decens

Binomial name
- Comaserica decens Brenske, 1899

Species of beetle

Comaserica decens is a species of beetle of the family Scarabaeidae. It is found in Madagascar.

== Description ==
Adults reach a length of about 7-7.5 mm. They have an oblong oval, very densely opaque body, without opalescent sheen. They are silky shiny underneath and very dark brown above with a metallic sheen on the clypeus and half of the frons, and with a white setate patch on each side of the scutellum at the base of the pronotum. The clypeus is narrow, more rounded at the sides than at the front, truncated straight here, with a high margin, finely, slightly wrinkled-punctate, the fine setate punctures are located anterior to the suture and laterally in a semicircle. The suture is smooth. The frons behind it, as far as it is shiny, is finely punctured with individual, weak setate punctures, which are also located on the vertex. The pronotum is narrow, only slightly transverse, the anterior margin very delicate, the posterior margin only laterally and extremely finely bordered, the lateral margin is evenly rounded, the anterior angles hardly projecting, the posterior angles broadly rounded, the margins and the surface covered with short, erect, brown setae. The scutellum has individual fine, white hairs. The elytra are somewhat less distinctly but still clearly ribbed, the ribs are darkly spotted and interrupted by strong punctures, each containing a tiny hair. The fine punctures also have tiny hairs, interspersed with numerous brown setae. At the base and at the sutural angle of the apex, there is a tuft of white setae. The pygidium is flat with tiny, white hairs and, towards the apex, with erect, strong setae.
