= Aulacoserica sibutensis =

Scientific classification
- Kingdom: Animalia
- Phylum: Arthropoda
- Clade: Pancrustacea
- Class: Insecta
- Order: Coleoptera
- Suborder: Polyphaga
- Infraorder: Scarabaeiformia
- Family: Scarabaeidae
- Genus: Aulacoserica
- Species: A. sibutensis

Binomial name
- Aulacoserica sibutensis Moser, 1917

Species of beetle

Aulacoserica sibutensis is a species of beetle of the family Scarabaeidae. It is found in Benin, Cameroon, the Central African Republic and the Democratic Republic of the Congo.

== Description ==
Adults reach a length of about 5.5–6 mm. They are yellowish-brown and shiny. The head is quite strongly punctate. The pronotum is densely punctate and the elytra have rows of punctures, with the shallow intervals being rather densely punctured.
