= Comaserica variegata =

Scientific classification
- Kingdom: Animalia
- Phylum: Arthropoda
- Clade: Pancrustacea
- Class: Insecta
- Order: Coleoptera
- Suborder: Polyphaga
- Infraorder: Scarabaeiformia
- Family: Scarabaeidae
- Genus: Comaserica
- Species: C. variegata

Binomial name
- Comaserica variegata Moser, 1915

Species of beetle

Comaserica variegata is a species of beetle of the family Scarabaeidae. It is found in Madagascar.

== Description ==
Adults reach a length of about 7 mm. They are blackish-brown, but the elytra and legs are yellowish-brown, the ribs on the former partially dark. The head is, apart from the setae, almost unpunctate. The antennae are brown. The pronotum is finely punctate, with setate lateral margins. The elytra are covered in stripes with irregular rows of punctures with tiny setae. Some punctures have stronger setae.
