= Comaserica granulipennis =

Scientific classification
- Kingdom: Animalia
- Phylum: Arthropoda
- Class: Insecta
- Order: Coleoptera
- Suborder: Polyphaga
- Infraorder: Scarabaeiformia
- Family: Scarabaeidae
- Genus: Comaserica
- Species: C. granulipennis

Binomial name
- Comaserica granulipennis (Fairmaire, 1897)

Synonyms
- Homaloplia granulipennis Fairmaire, 1897

Species of beetle

Comaserica granulipennis is a species of beetle of the family Scarabaeidae. It is found in Madagascar.

== Description ==
Adults reach a length of about 6.5 mm. The head is metallic and shiny, while the rest of the surface is covered with sparse hairs. On the elytra, the ribs are indistinct and only noticeable as small, smooth, slightly raised spots, between which distinct rows of setae extend. The pygidium is pointed and has long setae.
