= Comaserica sparsa =

Scientific classification
- Kingdom: Animalia
- Phylum: Arthropoda
- Clade: Pancrustacea
- Class: Insecta
- Order: Coleoptera
- Suborder: Polyphaga
- Infraorder: Scarabaeiformia
- Family: Scarabaeidae
- Genus: Comaserica
- Species: C. sparsa

Binomial name
- Comaserica sparsa Moser, 1915

Species of beetle

Comaserica sparsa is a species of beetle of the family Scarabaeidae. It is found in Madagascar.

== Description ==
Adults reach a length of about 7 mm. They are blackish-brown, but the elytra are brown and irregularly dark-spotted. The frons is widely punctate and has a transverse row of setae behind the suture, as well as some setae next to the eyes and in the middle. The antennae are yellowish-brown. The pronotum has moderately dense punctation and scattered setae and the elytra have irregular rows of punctures in the striations, while the weakly convex intervals are almost devoid of punctures. The punctures, like the punctures on the pronotum, have tiny setae, but occasionally there are also strong setae, particularly beside the suture and in front of the posterior margin.
