= Pachycnema multiguttata =

Scientific classification
- Kingdom: Animalia
- Phylum: Arthropoda
- Class: Insecta
- Order: Coleoptera
- Suborder: Polyphaga
- Infraorder: Scarabaeiformia
- Family: Scarabaeidae
- Genus: Pachycnema
- Species: P. multiguttata

Binomial name
- Pachycnema multiguttata (Thunberg, 1818)

Synonyms
- Trichius multiguttatus Thunberg, 1818; Pachycnema farinosa Péringuey, 1888; Pachycnema signatipennis Burmeister, 1844

Species of beetle

Pachycnema multiguttata is a species of beetle of the family Scarabaeidae. It is found in South Africa (Northern Cape, Western Cape).

== Description ==
Adults reach a length of about 10–10.5 mm (0.39–0.41 in). They are light chestnut, densely clothed with lanceolate white scales, and a very brief, greyish pubescence on the head and pronotum. The scutellum is scaly and the elytra are covered with white scales, which are denser and more closely set in parts, and thus forming on each side three narrow, elongate patches on the anterior part and two long, broad ones on the posterior. The abdomen is clothed with white scales, while the under side and legs are clothed with very dense white hairs.
