= Aulacoserica rufofusca =

Scientific classification
- Kingdom: Animalia
- Phylum: Arthropoda
- Clade: Pancrustacea
- Class: Insecta
- Order: Coleoptera
- Suborder: Polyphaga
- Infraorder: Scarabaeiformia
- Family: Scarabaeidae
- Genus: Aulacoserica
- Species: A. rufofusca

Binomial name
- Aulacoserica rufofusca Moser, 1918

Species of beetle

Aulacoserica rufofusca is a species of beetle of the family Scarabaeidae. It is found in Cameroon.

== Description ==
Adults reach a length of about 6 mm. They are reddish-brown and shiny. The head is densely punctured and the antennae are reddish-yellow, with a yellow club. The pronotum is rather densely punctate and the elytra have rows of punctures, with the intervals moderately densely covered with punctures. The underside is weakly punctate in the middle, becoming more strongly punctate towards the sides.
