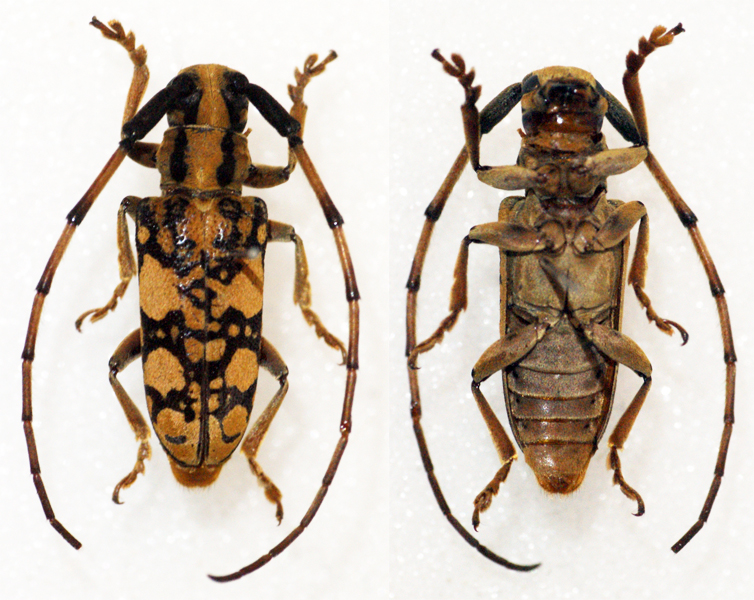
- Cremnosterna carissima

Scientific classification
- Kingdom: Animalia
- Phylum: Arthropoda
- Class: Insecta
- Order: Coleoptera
- Suborder: Polyphaga
- Infraorder: Cucujiformia
- Family: Cerambycidae
- Tribe: Lamiini
- Genus: Cremnosterna

= Cremnosterna =

Genus of beetles

Cremnosterna is a genus of longhorn beetles of the subfamily Lamiinae, containing the following species:

- Cremnosterna alboplagiata Breuning, 1935
- Cremnosterna alternans Breuning & Itzinger, 1943
- Cremnosterna carissima (Pascoe, 1857)
- Cremnosterna laterialba Breuning, 1936
- Cremnosterna parvicollis (Gahan, 1895)
- Cremnosterna plagiata (White, 1858)
- Cremnosterna quadriplagiata Breuning, 1940
