= Comaserica adspersa =

Scientific classification
- Kingdom: Animalia
- Phylum: Arthropoda
- Clade: Pancrustacea
- Class: Insecta
- Order: Coleoptera
- Suborder: Polyphaga
- Infraorder: Scarabaeiformia
- Family: Scarabaeidae
- Genus: Comaserica
- Species: C. adspersa

Binomial name
- Comaserica adspersa Moser, 1915

Species of beetle

Comaserica adspersa is a species of beetle of the family Scarabaeidae. It is found in Madagascar.

== Description ==
Adults reach a length of about 5 mm. The head is sparsely setate and the frons is widely punctate. The antennae are brown, with a darkened club. The pronotum is fairly widely punctate and covered with scattered setae. The scutellum is covered with white scales besides the sides and the elytra are slightly furrowed. The furrows are irregularly dotted with rows of punctures, with the spaces between them almost devoid of punctures. The elytra are covered with scattered pale setae, particularly posteriorly next to the suture and in front of the posterior margin.
