= Comaserica foveicollis =

Scientific classification
- Kingdom: Animalia
- Phylum: Arthropoda
- Class: Insecta
- Order: Coleoptera
- Suborder: Polyphaga
- Infraorder: Scarabaeiformia
- Family: Scarabaeidae
- Genus: Comaserica
- Species: C. foveicollis

Binomial name
- Comaserica foveicollis Brenske, 1900

Species of beetle

Comaserica foveicollis is a species of beetle of the family Scarabaeidae. It is found in Madagascar.

== Description ==
Adults reach a length of about 4.5 mm. They are colourful with mottled elytra and a silky sheen. The frons is finely punctate. The somewhat broadened pronotum is slightly projecting anteriorly and the sides and posterior margin are finely margined up to the middle, where a fine ring of hairs is located. The scutellum has white hairs on the sides. The elytra are dark-spotted, the striae very indistinct and blurred, with scattered, very indistinct setate punctures. The legs are reddish-brown.
