= Aulacoserica haafi =

Scientific classification
- Kingdom: Animalia
- Phylum: Arthropoda
- Class: Insecta
- Order: Coleoptera
- Suborder: Polyphaga
- Infraorder: Scarabaeiformia
- Family: Scarabaeidae
- Genus: Aulacoserica
- Species: A. haafi

Binomial name
- Aulacoserica haafi Frey, 1968

Species of beetle

Aulacoserica haafi is a species of beetle of the family Scarabaeidae. It is found in the Democratic Republic of the Congo.

== Description ==
Adults reach a length of about 4.5 mm. The upper and lower surfaces are dark brown (but the antennae are brown). The body is short and egg-shaped. The pronotum is densely and finely punctate, while the elytra are very finely striated in punctures.
