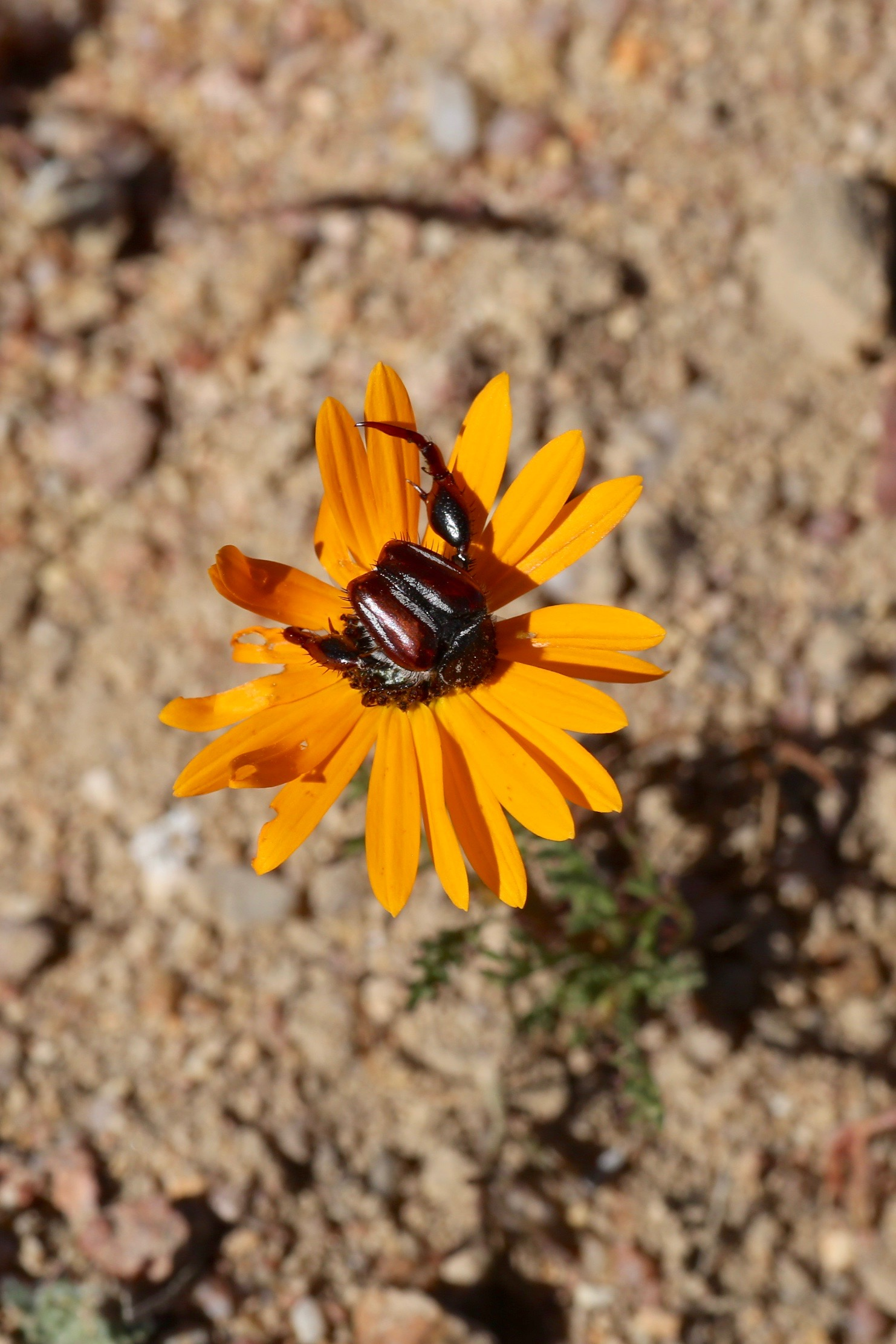

Scientific classification
- Kingdom: Animalia
- Phylum: Arthropoda
- Class: Insecta
- Order: Coleoptera
- Suborder: Polyphaga
- Infraorder: Scarabaeiformia
- Family: Scarabaeidae
- Genus: Pachycnema
- Species: P. calcarata

Binomial name
- Pachycnema calcarata Burmeister, 1844

= Pachycnema calcarata =

Species of beetle

Pachycnema calcarata is a species of beetle of the family Scarabaeidae. It is found in South Africa (Northern Cape, Eastern Cape, Western Cape).

== Description ==
Adults reach a length of about 8.75–9.5 mm (0.344–0.374 in). The head and pronotum are black, the latter has an all round border of white scales, somewhat flavescent in females, and six small scaly white patches on the disk. The elytra are red in males, and flavescent in females, and have a broad white band on each side, reaching from the base to two-thirds of the length, and a supra-marginal, slightly longer but a little narrower one, as well as a third rudimentary and basal (which is often, however, obliterated). In females, these bands are somewhat flavescent. The pygidium is clothed laterally and along the base with white scales. The legs are black.
