= Comaserica macrophthalma =

Scientific classification
- Kingdom: Animalia
- Phylum: Arthropoda
- Clade: Pancrustacea
- Class: Insecta
- Order: Coleoptera
- Suborder: Polyphaga
- Infraorder: Scarabaeiformia
- Family: Scarabaeidae
- Genus: Comaserica
- Species: C. macrophthalma

Binomial name
- Comaserica macrophthalma Moser, 1915

Species of beetle

Comaserica macrophthalma is a species of beetle of the family Scarabaeidae. It is found in Madagascar.

== Description ==
Adults reach a length of about 5 mm. They are blackish-brown above and below, with numerous small yellowish-brown speckles on the elytra. The upper surface is also covered with erect yellow setae. The frons is strongly and densely punctate behind the suture, and sparsely punctate posteriorly. The pronotum is moderately densely punctate and the elytra are punctured in the grooves. The punctures are of unequal thickness. The finer punctures have tiny light setae, while the bolder punctures have erect setae.
