= Comaserica metallescens =

Scientific classification
- Kingdom: Animalia
- Phylum: Arthropoda
- Clade: Pancrustacea
- Class: Insecta
- Order: Coleoptera
- Suborder: Polyphaga
- Infraorder: Scarabaeiformia
- Family: Scarabaeidae
- Genus: Comaserica
- Species: C. metallescens

Binomial name
- Comaserica metallescens Moser, 1911

Species of beetle

Comaserica metallescens is a species of beetle of the family Scarabaeidae. It is found in Madagascar.

== Description ==
Adults reach a length of about 6 mm. They have a shiny, metallic-shimmering upper surface. The head is coppery, the frons coarsely and densely punctate and with individual setae. The pronotum is sparsely punctate, with a large, irregular green spot on the disc. The scutellum is yellow and punctate on the sides. The elytra have double rows of punctures, and all the intervals are convex, giving the elytra a ribbed appearance. They are yellow and black spotted. The elytra shimmer metallic green. In the rear half, the sides are fringed with white hairs.
