= Comaserica bergrothi =

Scientific classification
- Kingdom: Animalia
- Phylum: Arthropoda
- Class: Insecta
- Order: Coleoptera
- Suborder: Polyphaga
- Infraorder: Scarabaeiformia
- Family: Scarabaeidae
- Genus: Comaserica
- Species: C. bergrothi

Binomial name
- Comaserica bergrothi Brenske, 1900

Species of beetle

Comaserica bergrothi is a species of beetle of the family Scarabaeidae. It is found in Madagascar.

== Description ==
Adults reach a length of about 6 mm. They have a narrow body similar to Comaserica conspurcata. They are dull, brown, with a lighter spotted elytra with white setae. There is a ring of hairs in front of the scutellum. The frons is densely but finely punctate, with setate punctures along the suture. The pronotum is not narrowed, finely punctate, with finer whitish setae on the sides and with the surface covered with finer whitish setae. The elytra are very weakly striate, finely punctate with scattered distinct white setae. A weak group of setae is present at the sutural angle.
