= Cremnosterna parvicollis =

Scientific classification
- Kingdom: Animalia
- Phylum: Arthropoda
- Class: Insecta
- Order: Coleoptera
- Suborder: Polyphaga
- Infraorder: Cucujiformia
- Family: Cerambycidae
- Genus: Cremnosterna
- Species: C. parvicollis

Binomial name
- Cremnosterna parvicollis (Gahan, 1895)

Species of beetle

Cremnosterna parvicollis is a species of beetle in the family Cerambycidae. It was described by Charles Joseph Gahan in 1895.
