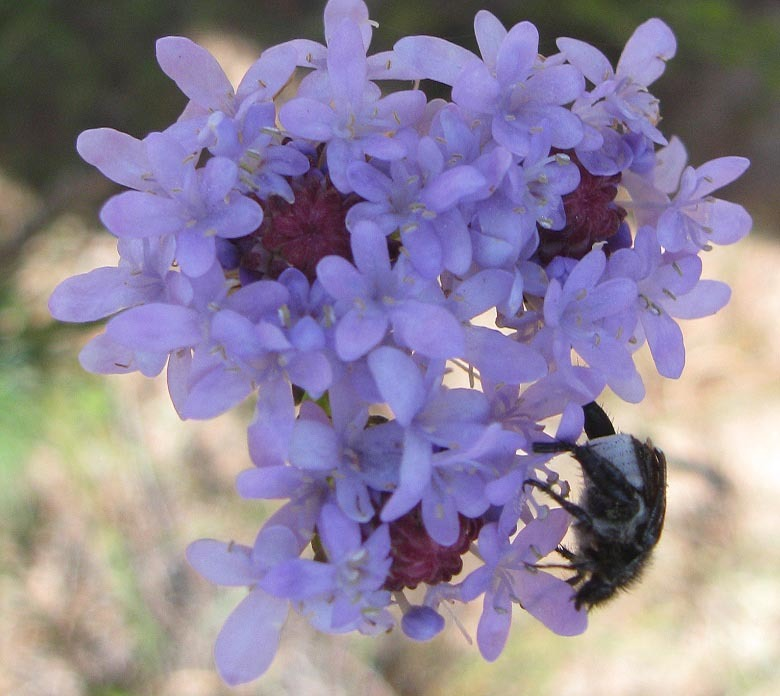

Scientific classification
- Kingdom: Animalia
- Phylum: Arthropoda
- Class: Insecta
- Order: Coleoptera
- Suborder: Polyphaga
- Infraorder: Scarabaeiformia
- Family: Scarabaeidae
- Genus: Pachycnema
- Species: P. crassipes

Binomial name
- Pachycnema crassipes (Fabricius, 1775)

Synonyms
- Melolontha crassipes Fabricius, 1775; Cetonia crassipes Olivier, 1789; Trichius maculatus Fabricius, 1781; Scarabaeus obscurepurpureus DeGeer, 1778

= Pachycnema crassipes =

Species of beetle

Pachycnema crassipes is a species of beetle of the family Scarabaeidae. It is found in South Africa (Western Cape, Northern Cape).

== Description ==
Adults reach a length of about 8.5–9 mm (0.33–0.35 in). They are similar to Pachycnema alternans, but smaller and the colour (including that of the hind legs) is entirely black in males, but the elytra and also the hind legs are red in females. The scales are white in males and yellow in females, the and the median longitudinal band of the pronotum and the four small spots are similar, but at the base of the elytra there are on each side two small scaly patches.
