= Aulacoserica diversicornis =

Scientific classification
- Kingdom: Animalia
- Phylum: Arthropoda
- Class: Insecta
- Order: Coleoptera
- Suborder: Polyphaga
- Infraorder: Scarabaeiformia
- Family: Scarabaeidae
- Genus: Aulacoserica
- Species: A. diversicornis

Binomial name
- Aulacoserica diversicornis Frey, 1974

Species of beetle

Aulacoserica diversicornis is a species of beetle of the family Scarabaeidae. It is found in Ghana.

== Description ==
Adults reach a length of about 6 mm. The upper and lower surfaces are shiny light reddish-brown, while the antennae are yellow. The pronotum is very finely and moderately densely punctate and the elytra have faintly distinct punctate striae.
