= Cremnosterna alboplagiata =

Scientific classification
- Kingdom: Animalia
- Phylum: Arthropoda
- Class: Insecta
- Order: Coleoptera
- Suborder: Polyphaga
- Infraorder: Cucujiformia
- Family: Cerambycidae
- Genus: Cremnosterna
- Species: C. alboplagiata

Binomial name
- Cremnosterna alboplagiata Breuning, 1935

Species of beetle

Cremnosterna alboplagiata is a species of beetle in the family Cerambycidae. It was described by Stephan von Breuning in 1935.
