= Comaserica dissidens =

Scientific classification
- Kingdom: Animalia
- Phylum: Arthropoda
- Clade: Pancrustacea
- Class: Insecta
- Order: Coleoptera
- Suborder: Polyphaga
- Infraorder: Scarabaeiformia
- Family: Scarabaeidae
- Genus: Comaserica
- Species: C. dissidens

Binomial name
- Comaserica dissidens Moser, 1918

Species of beetle

Comaserica dissidens is a species of beetle of the family Scarabaeidae. It is found in Madagascar.

== Description ==
Adults reach a length of about 6 mm. The upper surface is blackish-brown, the elytra with small lighter spots. The head is very sparsely punctate and the frons is green and dull. The antennae are yellowish-brown. There is dense tomentum on the pronotum and there are a few setae on the disc. The elytra have rows of punctures, with the intervals widely covered with punctures. There are also some yellowish setae arranged in rows.
