= Pachycnema moerens =

Scientific classification
- Kingdom: Animalia
- Phylum: Arthropoda
- Class: Insecta
- Order: Coleoptera
- Suborder: Polyphaga
- Infraorder: Scarabaeiformia
- Family: Scarabaeidae
- Genus: Pachycnema
- Species: P. moerens

Binomial name
- Pachycnema moerens Péringuey, 1902

Species of beetle

Pachycnema moerens is a species of beetle of the family Scarabaeidae. It is found in South Africa (Western Cape).

== Description ==
Adults reach a length of about 9–10.5 mm (0.35–0.41 in). They are very similar to Pachycnema marginella, but the colour is opaque black in males (with the propygidium, pygidium and abdomen clothed with white scales), and reddish brown on the elytra in females (with the pygidium and abdomen yellow). There is a faint trace of a scaly band in the anterior part of the sides of the pronotum, but no scaly patches or spots on the disk, and on the elytra the setae of the sutural and marginal rows are much longer in females.
