= Aulacoserica minor =

Scientific classification
- Kingdom: Animalia
- Phylum: Arthropoda
- Class: Insecta
- Order: Coleoptera
- Suborder: Polyphaga
- Infraorder: Scarabaeiformia
- Family: Scarabaeidae
- Genus: Aulacoserica
- Species: A. minor

Binomial name
- Aulacoserica minor Frey, 1974

Species of beetle

Aulacoserica minor is a species of beetle of the family Scarabaeidae. It is found in Ghana.

== Description ==
Adults reach a length of about 5 mm. The upper and lower surfaces are light reddish-brown and the antennae are yellow. The elytra are finely punctate-striate.
