= Aulacoserica gabonensis =

Scientific classification
- Kingdom: Animalia
- Phylum: Arthropoda
- Class: Insecta
- Order: Coleoptera
- Suborder: Polyphaga
- Infraorder: Scarabaeiformia
- Family: Scarabaeidae
- Genus: Aulacoserica
- Species: A. gabonensis

Binomial name
- Aulacoserica gabonensis Frey, 1974

Species of beetle

Aulacoserica gabonensis is a species of beetle of the family Scarabaeidae. It is found in Gabon.

== Description ==
Adults reach a length of about 9 mm. They are black, with very dark reddish-brown legs. The pygidium is light reddish-brown. The upper surface is strongly shiny, and both the upper and lower surfaces are glabrous. The pronotum and scutellum are finely, moderately densely and evenly punctate. The elytra have fine striae of punctures, with the intervals as finely as the pronotum, but somewhat less densely punctate.
