= Pachycnema abdominalis =

Scientific classification
- Kingdom: Animalia
- Phylum: Arthropoda
- Class: Insecta
- Order: Coleoptera
- Suborder: Polyphaga
- Infraorder: Scarabaeiformia
- Family: Scarabaeidae
- Genus: Pachycnema
- Species: P. abdominalis

Binomial name
- Pachycnema abdominalis (Burmeister, 1844)

Synonyms
- Anisonyx abdominalis Burmeister, 1844; Pachycnema nigrolimbata Péringuey, 1888

Species of beetle

Pachycnema abdominalis is a species of beetle of the family Scarabaeidae. It is found in South Africa (Northern Cape).

== Description ==
Adults reach a length of about 8–9 mm (0.31–0.35 in). They are black, clothed on the head, pronotum and scutellum with long, black hairs interspersed in males with greyish-white ones. The abdomen and pygidium are clothed with white scales. The elytra are light testaceous brown, edged all round, and also along the suture, with a fuscous band, along the posterior part of the suture there is a narrow line of silvery-white scales. The legs are black.
