= Comaserica =

Scientific classification
- Kingdom: Animalia
- Phylum: Arthropoda
- Class: Insecta
- Order: Coleoptera
- Suborder: Polyphaga
- Infraorder: Scarabaeiformia
- Family: Scarabaeidae
- Subfamily: Sericinae
- Tribe: Sericini
- Genus: Comaserica; Brenske, 1897

Synonyms
- Dissotoxus Fairmaire, 1899

Genus of leaf beetles

Comaserica is a genus of beetles belonging to the family Scarabaeidae.

== Species ==
- Comaserica adspersa Moser, 1915
- Comaserica alluaudi Moser, 1915
- Comaserica alternans Moser, 1915
- Comaserica aurita Brenske, 1900
- Comaserica basilewskyi Frey, 1975
- Comaserica bergrothi Brenske, 1900
- Comaserica bouvieri Brenske, 1899
- Comaserica conspurcata (Blanchard, 1850)
- Comaserica costatipennis Moser, 1915
- Comaserica costifera Frey, 1975
- Comaserica costipennis (Fairmaire, 1901)
- Comaserica crinita (Burmeister, 1855)
- Comaserica dapsilis Brenske, 1899
- Comaserica decens Brenske, 1899
- Comaserica discolor Brenske, 1900
- Comaserica dissidens Moser, 1918
- Comaserica foveicollis Brenske, 1900
- Comaserica fuliginosa (Blanchard, 1850)
- Comaserica granulipennis (Fairmaire, 1897)
- Comaserica hildebrandti Brenske, 1900
- Comaserica insignicornis (Fairmaire, 1900)
- Comaserica irrorata (Blanchard, 1850)
- Comaserica luridosparsa Moser, 1926
- Comaserica macrophthalma Moser, 1915
- Comaserica metallescens Moser, 1911
- Comaserica mocquerysi Brenske, 1900
- Comaserica murina Frey, 1975
- Comaserica picticollis (Fairmaire, 1897)
- Comaserica pilosicollis Moser, 1926
- Comaserica rufocostata Moser, 1911
- Comaserica setosella Moser, 1911
- Comaserica setosicollis (Blanchard, 1850)
- Comaserica setosipennis (Blanchard, 1850)
- Comaserica setulifera Frey, 1975
- Comaserica simillima Brenske, 1899
- Comaserica sparsa Moser, 1915
- Comaserica tessellata (Klug, 1834)
- Comaserica testacea Moser, 1911
- Comaserica trimaculata Frey, 1975
- Comaserica variegata Moser, 1915
