= Pachycnema kochi =

Scientific classification
- Kingdom: Animalia
- Phylum: Arthropoda
- Class: Insecta
- Order: Coleoptera
- Suborder: Polyphaga
- Infraorder: Scarabaeiformia
- Family: Scarabaeidae
- Genus: Pachycnema
- Species: P. kochi

Binomial name
- Pachycnema kochi Schein, 1959

Species of beetle

Pachycnema kochi is a species of beetle of the family Scarabaeidae. It is found in South Africa (Northern Cape) and Namibia.

== Description ==
Adults reach a length of about 7.5 mm (0.30 in). They are black with. The pronotum has a white border at the front and back and has a transverse row of four white spots. There are two transverse rows of white spots on the elytra. The propygidium has a broad white border and the pygidium is white at the apex. Males also have a white abdomen. In females, the spots are larger and the pygidium is completely white.
