= Comaserica setosipennis =

Scientific classification
- Kingdom: Animalia
- Phylum: Arthropoda
- Class: Insecta
- Order: Coleoptera
- Suborder: Polyphaga
- Infraorder: Scarabaeiformia
- Family: Scarabaeidae
- Genus: Comaserica
- Species: C. setosipennis

Binomial name
- Comaserica setosipennis (Blanchard, 1850)

Synonyms
- Emphania setosipennis Blanchard, 1850

Species of beetle

Comaserica setosipennis is a species of beetle of the family Scarabaeidae. It is found in Madagascar.

== Description ==
Adults reach a length of about 6 mm. The clypeus is somewhat elongated, almost rounded, very finely curved at the front, slightly margined, very densely wrinkled-punctate and, like the frons, densely setate, with an impression in front of the scutellum. The elytra are yellow with dark spots and densely covered with brownish setae, the secondary ribs are absent. The pygidium is finely setate. The underside is finely pubescent.
