= Aulacoserica baraudi =

Scientific classification
- Kingdom: Animalia
- Phylum: Arthropoda
- Class: Insecta
- Order: Coleoptera
- Suborder: Polyphaga
- Infraorder: Scarabaeiformia
- Family: Scarabaeidae
- Genus: Aulacoserica
- Species: A. baraudi

Binomial name
- Aulacoserica baraudi Frey, 1968

Species of beetle

Aulacoserica baraudi is a species of beetle of the family Scarabaeidae. It is found in the Republic of the Congo.

== Description ==
Adults reach a length of about 5.5–6 mm. They are dark reddish-brown, with the head and pronotum often light reddish-brown. The pronotum is finely and moderately densely punctured, while the elytra are finely and moderately densely punctured, the punctures between the rows are somewhat irregular.
