= Aulacoserica kulzeri =

Scientific classification
- Kingdom: Animalia
- Phylum: Arthropoda
- Class: Insecta
- Order: Coleoptera
- Suborder: Polyphaga
- Infraorder: Scarabaeiformia
- Family: Scarabaeidae
- Genus: Aulacoserica
- Species: A. kulzeri

Binomial name
- Aulacoserica kulzeri Frey, 1975

Species of beetle

Aulacoserica kulzeri is a species of beetle of the family Scarabaeidae. It is found in Guinea.

== Description ==
Adults reach a length of about 5 mm. The upper and lower surfaces are shiny blackish-brown, while the underside is brown and shiny. The upper and lower surfaces are glabrous. The antennae are light brown. The pronotum is finely punctate and the elytra have very indistinct striae of punctures.
