= Aulacoserica deremana =

Scientific classification
- Kingdom: Animalia
- Phylum: Arthropoda
- Clade: Pancrustacea
- Class: Insecta
- Order: Coleoptera
- Suborder: Polyphaga
- Infraorder: Scarabaeiformia
- Family: Scarabaeidae
- Genus: Aulacoserica
- Species: A. deremana

Binomial name
- Aulacoserica deremana Moser, 1918

Species of beetle

Aulacoserica deremana is a species of beetle of the family Scarabaeidae. It is found in Tanzania.

== Description ==
Adults reach a length of about 7 mm. They are shiny, blackish-brown above and reddish-brown below. The head is densely punctate. The pronotum is broad and the anterior margin is densely punctate in the middle, as is the surface of the scutellum. The elytra have rows of punctures, with the intervals quite densely punctured. The underside is moderately densely punctate in the middle, becoming more closely punctate towards the sides.
