= Aulacoserica boeri =

Scientific classification
- Kingdom: Animalia
- Phylum: Arthropoda
- Clade: Pancrustacea
- Class: Insecta
- Order: Coleoptera
- Suborder: Polyphaga
- Infraorder: Scarabaeiformia
- Family: Scarabaeidae
- Genus: Aulacoserica
- Species: A. boeri

Binomial name
- Aulacoserica boeri Moser, 1917

Species of beetle

Aulacoserica boeri is a species of beetle of the family Scarabaeidae. It is found in Tanzania.

== Description ==
Adults reach a length of about 7 mm. They are yellowish-red and shiny. The head is quite strongly punctate. The pronotum is densely punctate and the elytra have rows of punctures, with the intervals shallow and quite densely punctured.
