= Comaserica testacea =

Scientific classification
- Kingdom: Animalia
- Phylum: Arthropoda
- Clade: Pancrustacea
- Class: Insecta
- Order: Coleoptera
- Suborder: Polyphaga
- Infraorder: Scarabaeiformia
- Family: Scarabaeidae
- Genus: Comaserica
- Species: C. testacea

Binomial name
- Comaserica testacea Moser, 1911

Species of beetle

Comaserica testacea is a species of beetle of the family Scarabaeidae. It is found in Madagascar.

== Description ==
Adults reach a length of about 5.5 mm. They are uniformly yellowish-brown, except for the reddish-brown head. The upper surface is tomentose. The frons has a greenish sheen and has scattered punctures and individual erect yellow hairs. The pronotum has very fine, bristle-free punctures and coarser ones, which do have setae. The lateral margins are fringed with yellow hairs. The elytra have double rows of fine punctures and occasional coarser punctures, which have setae.
