= Aulacoserica guineensis =

Scientific classification
- Kingdom: Animalia
- Phylum: Arthropoda
- Class: Insecta
- Order: Coleoptera
- Suborder: Polyphaga
- Infraorder: Scarabaeiformia
- Family: Scarabaeidae
- Genus: Aulacoserica
- Species: A. guineensis

Binomial name
- Aulacoserica guineensis Frey, 1968

Species of beetle

Aulacoserica guineensis is a species of beetle of the family Scarabaeidae. It is found in Guinea.

== Description ==
Adults reach a length of about 6.5–7 mm. The upper and lower surfaces are light reddish-brown. The upper surface is densely and coarsely punctate. The frons is also densely and coarsely punctate, while the vertex is finely and densely punctate and the pronotum and elytra are densely and moderately punctate, the latter with punctate striae.
