= Pachycnema luteoguttata =

Scientific classification
- Kingdom: Animalia
- Phylum: Arthropoda
- Class: Insecta
- Order: Coleoptera
- Suborder: Polyphaga
- Infraorder: Scarabaeiformia
- Family: Scarabaeidae
- Genus: Pachycnema
- Species: P. luteoguttata

Binomial name
- Pachycnema luteoguttata Schein, 1959

Species of beetle

Pachycnema luteoguttata is a species of beetle of the family Scarabaeidae. It is found in South Africa (Northern Cape).

== Description ==
Adults reach a length of about 8–9 mm (0.31–0.35 in). They are black with greyish-white scales. They have seven orange-yellow spots on each elytron.
