= Comaserica fuliginosa =

Scientific classification
- Kingdom: Animalia
- Phylum: Arthropoda
- Class: Insecta
- Order: Coleoptera
- Suborder: Polyphaga
- Infraorder: Scarabaeiformia
- Family: Scarabaeidae
- Genus: Comaserica
- Species: C. fuliginosa

Binomial name
- Comaserica fuliginosa (Blanchard, 1850)

Synonyms
- Emphania fuliginosa Blanchard, 1850

Species of beetle

Comaserica fuliginosa is a species of beetle of the family Scarabaeidae. It is found in Madagascar.

== Description ==
Adults reach a length of about 7 mm. They are easily recognizable by its yellow-haired pronotum, scutellum, and elytra. There are irregular markings on the elytra, with slightly raised transverse rows.
