= Aulacoserica pygmaea =

Scientific classification
- Kingdom: Animalia
- Phylum: Arthropoda
- Clade: Pancrustacea
- Class: Insecta
- Order: Coleoptera
- Suborder: Polyphaga
- Infraorder: Scarabaeiformia
- Family: Scarabaeidae
- Genus: Aulacoserica
- Species: A. pygmaea

Binomial name
- Aulacoserica pygmaea Moser, 1918

Species of beetle

Aulacoserica pygmaea is a species of beetle of the family Scarabaeidae. It is found in the Democratic Republic of the Congo.

== Description ==
Adults reach a length of about 4.5 mm. They are yellowish-brown and shiny. The head is moderately densely punctured. The surface of the pronotum, like that of the scutellum, is quite densely punctured and the elytra have rows of punctures, with the intervals quite densely punctured. The center of the thorax is covered with very faint punctation, while the sides of the thorax and the abdomen are covered with strong punctures.
