= Aulacoserica puerilis =

Scientific classification
- Kingdom: Animalia
- Phylum: Arthropoda
- Class: Insecta
- Order: Coleoptera
- Suborder: Polyphaga
- Infraorder: Scarabaeiformia
- Family: Scarabaeidae
- Genus: Aulacoserica
- Species: A. puerilis

Binomial name
- Aulacoserica puerilis Frey, 1968

Species of beetle

Aulacoserica puerilis is a species of beetle of the family Scarabaeidae. It is found in Guinea.

== Description ==
Adults reach a length of about 5-5.2 mm. The upper and lower surfaces are light reddish-brown. The upper surface of the head is very densely and coarsely, somewhat irregularly punctate and the pronotum is moderately and densely punctate. The elytra are densely and moderately punctate with striae.
