= Comaserica trimaculata =

Scientific classification
- Kingdom: Animalia
- Phylum: Arthropoda
- Class: Insecta
- Order: Coleoptera
- Suborder: Polyphaga
- Infraorder: Scarabaeiformia
- Family: Scarabaeidae
- Genus: Comaserica
- Species: C. trimaculata

Binomial name
- Comaserica trimaculata Frey, 1975

Species of beetle

Comaserica trimaculata is a species of beetle of the family Scarabaeidae. It is found in Madagascar.

== Description ==
Adults reach a length of about 6 mm. They have a strongly convex, egg-shaped body. The upper and lower surfaces are light reddish-brown, dull and tomentose. The head, a rounded spot on the disc in the apical half of each elytron, and a long, rectangular spot extending across the suture at the elytral apex, are black. The legs are black and shiny and the antennae are light brown. The sides of the elytra and part of the pronotum have light brown cilia.
