= Comaserica rufocostata =

Scientific classification
- Kingdom: Animalia
- Phylum: Arthropoda
- Clade: Pancrustacea
- Class: Insecta
- Order: Coleoptera
- Suborder: Polyphaga
- Infraorder: Scarabaeiformia
- Family: Scarabaeidae
- Genus: Comaserica
- Species: C. rufocostata

Binomial name
- Comaserica rufocostata Moser, 1911

Species of beetle

Comaserica rufocostata is a species of beetle of the family Scarabaeidae. It is found in Madagascar.

== Description ==
Adults reach a length of about 5 mm. The head is shiny and olive-green. The frons is sparsely punctate. The pronotum is olive brown, faintly shiny and sparsely and finely punctate. The lateral margins are fringed with yellowish hairs. The elytra have double rows of punctures and the primary ribs are reddish-brown, with yellow interstices. The surface has some setae, particularly towards the posterior end, and the lateral margins are fringed with yellow hairs.
