= Comaserica pilosicollis =

Scientific classification
- Kingdom: Animalia
- Phylum: Arthropoda
- Clade: Pancrustacea
- Class: Insecta
- Order: Coleoptera
- Suborder: Polyphaga
- Infraorder: Scarabaeiformia
- Family: Scarabaeidae
- Genus: Comaserica
- Species: C. pilosicollis

Binomial name
- Comaserica pilosicollis Moser, 1926

Species of beetle

Comaserica pilosicollis is a species of beetle of the family Scarabaeidae. It is found in Madagascar.

== Description ==
Adults reach a length of about 5–6 mm. They are black and opaque. The head is punctate and sparsely setose and the antennae are reddish-yellow. The pronotum is moderately densely punctate, with the punctures of unequal size. The larger punctures are hairy. The elytra are serrate, with the interstices nearly flat and irregularly punctate at the intervals. Some larger punctures are setose.
