= Pachycnema pudibunda =

Scientific classification
- Kingdom: Animalia
- Phylum: Arthropoda
- Class: Insecta
- Order: Coleoptera
- Suborder: Polyphaga
- Infraorder: Scarabaeiformia
- Family: Scarabaeidae
- Genus: Pachycnema
- Species: P. pudibunda

Binomial name
- Pachycnema pudibunda (Burmeister, 1844)

Synonyms
- Stenocnema pudibunda Burmeister, 1844; Paragymnetis flavomarginata pudibunda; Paragymnetis pudibunda

Species of beetle

Pachycnema pudibunda is a species of beetle of the family Scarabaeidae. It is found in Namibia and South Africa (Western Cape, Eastern Cape, Northern Cape, Free State).

== Description ==
Adults reach a length of about 7–8.5 mm (0.28–0.33 in). They are chocolate-brown, with the head and pronotum fuscous. The head and the pronotum are very closely punctured and the punctures are filled with slightly flavescent scales, but they are also densely hairy, the hairs are flavescent in the anterior part of the pronotum, and shorter and black in the posterior where there is also a narrow band of small scales. The scutellum is scaly. The elytra have a band of minute yellowish contiguous scales beginning at a short distance from the base and merged in the rounded apical part with a similar supra-marginal band reaching very nearly to the base, there is another discoidal band along the costule, which does not reach much beyond the median part, and on each side are three discoidal distinct rows of short, stiff black setae.
