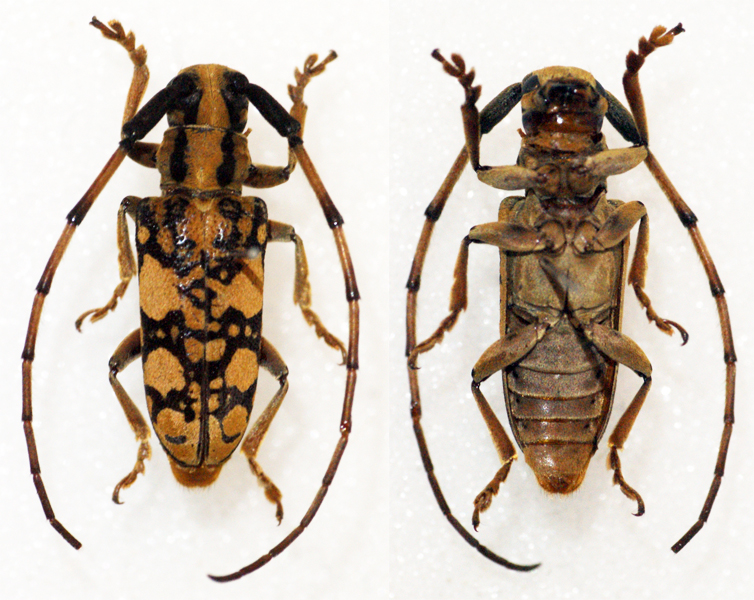

Scientific classification
- Kingdom: Animalia
- Phylum: Arthropoda
- Class: Insecta
- Order: Coleoptera
- Suborder: Polyphaga
- Infraorder: Cucujiformia
- Family: Cerambycidae
- Genus: Cremnosterna
- Species: C. carissima

Binomial name
- Cremnosterna carissima (Pascoe, 1857)

Synonyms
- Celosterna pardalis Thomson, 1865; Monochamus carissimus Pascoe, 1857

= Cremnosterna carissima =

Species of beetle

Cremnosterna carissima is a species of beetle in the family Cerambycidae. It was described by Francis Polkinghorne Pascoe in 1857. It is known from India, Myanmar, Cambodia, Laos, Thailand, Vietnam and Nepal.

== Varietas ==
- Cremnosterna carissima var. tesselata (White, 1858)
- Cremnosterna carissima var. unicolor Breuning, 1943
