= Aulacoserica ardoini =

Scientific classification
- Kingdom: Animalia
- Phylum: Arthropoda
- Class: Insecta
- Order: Coleoptera
- Suborder: Polyphaga
- Infraorder: Scarabaeiformia
- Family: Scarabaeidae
- Genus: Aulacoserica
- Species: A. ardoini

Binomial name
- Aulacoserica ardoini Frey, 1968

Species of beetle

Aulacoserica ardoini is a species of beetle of the family Scarabaeidae. It is found in Tanzania.

== Description ==
Adults reach a length of about 6 mm. The upper and lower surfaces are light reddish-brown and moderately shiny. The pronotum and elytra are moderately and finely punctate.
