= Aulacoserica popoana =

Scientific classification
- Kingdom: Animalia
- Phylum: Arthropoda
- Clade: Pancrustacea
- Class: Insecta
- Order: Coleoptera
- Suborder: Polyphaga
- Infraorder: Scarabaeiformia
- Family: Scarabaeidae
- Genus: Aulacoserica
- Species: A. popoana

Binomial name
- Aulacoserica popoana Moser, 1918

Species of beetle

Aulacoserica popoana is a species of beetle of the family Scarabaeidae. It is found in Togo.

== Description ==
Adults reach a length of about 7.5 mm. They are shiny and reddish-brown. The head is densely punctate. The pronotum is broad and densely punctate. The elytra have rows of punctures, with the intervals moderately densely punctured. On the thorax, the punctures are moderately dense, and the abdominal segments show a transverse row of setae on the sides.
