= Comaserica alluaudi =

Scientific classification
- Kingdom: Animalia
- Phylum: Arthropoda
- Clade: Pancrustacea
- Class: Insecta
- Order: Coleoptera
- Suborder: Polyphaga
- Infraorder: Scarabaeiformia
- Family: Scarabaeidae
- Genus: Comaserica
- Species: C. alluaudi

Binomial name
- Comaserica alluaudi Moser, 1915

Species of beetle

Comaserica alluaudi is a species of beetle of the family Scarabaeidae. It is found in Madagascar.

== Description ==
Adults reach a length of about 6 mm. They are blackish-brown, but the elytra are yellowish-brown with numerous small dark marks and the legs are brown. The frons is sparsely punctate and sporadically setate. The antennae are yellowish-brown. The pronotum is finely punctate and sparsely setate and the base is finely margined except for the middle. The elytra are slightly ribbed, moderately densely punctured, and covered with numerous setae that originate from coarser punctures.
