= Aulacoserica fraterna =

Scientific classification
- Kingdom: Animalia
- Phylum: Arthropoda
- Clade: Pancrustacea
- Class: Insecta
- Order: Coleoptera
- Suborder: Polyphaga
- Infraorder: Scarabaeiformia
- Family: Scarabaeidae
- Genus: Aulacoserica
- Species: A. fraterna

Binomial name
- Aulacoserica fraterna Moser, 1918

Species of beetle

Aulacoserica fraterna is a species of beetle of the family Scarabaeidae. It is found in Cameroon.

== Description ==
Adults reach a length of about 8 mm. They are shiny, reddish-brown, dark above and lighter below. The frons is quite densely punctate, with scattered setae. The antennae are reddish-yellow with a yellow club. The pronotum is quite densely punctured and the elytra have rows of punctures, with the intervals moderately densely punctured. On the underside, the middle is almost smooth, while the sides are moderately densely punctured.
