= Comaserica bouvieri =

Scientific classification
- Kingdom: Animalia
- Phylum: Arthropoda
- Class: Insecta
- Order: Coleoptera
- Suborder: Polyphaga
- Infraorder: Scarabaeiformia
- Family: Scarabaeidae
- Genus: Comaserica
- Species: C. bouvieri

Binomial name
- Comaserica bouvieri Brenske, 1899

Species of beetle

Comaserica bouvieri is a species of beetle of the family Scarabaeidae. It is found in Madagascar.

== Description ==
Adults reach a length of about 7 mm. They are very similar to Comaserica conspurcata, but may be distinguished by the antennae, by the clypeus (which is less densely wrinkled and punctate) and the pronotum (which is much shorter and more transversely shaped). There are distinct setae present on the clypeus, just as in C. conspurcata, but the clypeus is wider than in that species, and not tapering anteriorly. The entire head is stronger and broader. The pronotum has very broadly rounded hind angles. It is dull greenish with a few shallow impressions and setae. The elytra are coarsely punctate, wrinkled, and mottled with irregular, indistinct, narrow ribs.
