= Aulacoserica affinis =

Scientific classification
- Kingdom: Animalia
- Phylum: Arthropoda
- Clade: Pancrustacea
- Class: Insecta
- Order: Coleoptera
- Suborder: Polyphaga
- Infraorder: Scarabaeiformia
- Family: Scarabaeidae
- Genus: Aulacoserica
- Species: A. affinis

Binomial name
- Aulacoserica affinis Moser, 1918

Species of beetle

Aulacoserica affinis is a species of beetle of the family Scarabaeidae. It is found in Zimbabwe.

== Description ==
Adults reach a length of about 6 mm. They are reddish-yellow and shiny. The frons is extensively punctate. The surface of the pronotum and scutellum is densely punctate and the elytra have rows of punctures, with the intervals fairly densely punctured. The underside is almost smooth in the middle and sparsely punctate at the sides.
