= Comaserica basilewskyi =

Scientific classification
- Kingdom: Animalia
- Phylum: Arthropoda
- Class: Insecta
- Order: Coleoptera
- Suborder: Polyphaga
- Infraorder: Scarabaeiformia
- Family: Scarabaeidae
- Genus: Comaserica
- Species: C. basilewskyi

Binomial name
- Comaserica basilewskyi Frey, 1975

Species of beetle

Comaserica basilewskyi is a species of beetle of the family Scarabaeidae. It is found in Madagascar.

== Description ==
Adults reach a length of about 7–8 mm. They have an elongate, egg-shaped body. The upper and lower surfaces are dark bronze. The upper surface is shiny and the head is glabrous, while the pronotum and elytra are very sparsely fringed with whitish hairs. The elytra also has a few scattered, whitish, erect setae.
