= Aulacoserica crampelensis =

Scientific classification
- Kingdom: Animalia
- Phylum: Arthropoda
- Clade: Pancrustacea
- Class: Insecta
- Order: Coleoptera
- Suborder: Polyphaga
- Infraorder: Scarabaeiformia
- Family: Scarabaeidae
- Genus: Aulacoserica
- Species: A. crampelensis

Binomial name
- Aulacoserica crampelensis Moser, 1918

Species of beetle

Aulacoserica crampelensis is a species of beetle of the family Scarabaeidae. It is found in the Central African Republic.

== Description ==
Adults reach a length of about 6 mm. The frons is quite extensively punctate and the surface of the pronotum and that of the scutellum is densely and finely punctate. The elytra have rows of punctures, with the intervals widely covered with fine punctures.
