= Pachycnema lineola =

Scientific classification
- Kingdom: Animalia
- Phylum: Arthropoda
- Class: Insecta
- Order: Coleoptera
- Suborder: Polyphaga
- Infraorder: Scarabaeiformia
- Family: Scarabaeidae
- Genus: Pachycnema
- Species: P. lineola

Binomial name
- Pachycnema lineola Burmeister, 1844

Species of beetle

Pachycnema lineola is a species of beetle of the family Scarabaeidae. It is found in South Africa (Northern Cape, Western Cape).

== Description ==
Adults reach a length of about 8–10 mm (0.31–0.39 in). They are similar to Pachycnema namaqua. The head and pronotum are black, the latter has a very distinct lateral margin of white scales in both sexes, but the anterior margin has none, and in the basal one there is a short median band of them above the scutellum which is densely scaly. The elytra are reddish brown and opaque. The abdomen and pygidium are clothed with white or flavous scales.
