= Comaserica luridosparsa =

Scientific classification
- Kingdom: Animalia
- Phylum: Arthropoda
- Clade: Pancrustacea
- Class: Insecta
- Order: Coleoptera
- Suborder: Polyphaga
- Infraorder: Scarabaeiformia
- Family: Scarabaeidae
- Genus: Comaserica
- Species: C. luridosparsa

Binomial name
- Comaserica luridosparsa Moser, 1926

Species of beetle

Comaserica luridosparsa is a species of beetle of the family Scarabaeidae. It is found in Madagascar.

== Description ==
Adults reach a length of about 6.5 mm. They are black-brown and opaque. The head is sparsely punctate, with some setae behind the suture. The antennae are reddish-yellow. The pronotum is subtly punctate and the elytra are slightly sulcate, subtly punctate, very sparsely setose, near the sides with some scales.
