= Comaserica setulifera =

Scientific classification
- Kingdom: Animalia
- Phylum: Arthropoda
- Class: Insecta
- Order: Coleoptera
- Suborder: Polyphaga
- Infraorder: Scarabaeiformia
- Family: Scarabaeidae
- Genus: Comaserica
- Species: C. setulifera

Binomial name
- Comaserica setulifera Frey, 1975

Species of beetle

Comaserica setulifera is a species of beetle of the family Scarabaeidae. It is found in Madagascar.

== Description ==
Adults reach a length of about 7 mm. They have an elongate-oval body. The upper and lower surfaces are brown and (except for the faintly shiny clypeus), tomentose and dull., The entire upper surface is covered with short, rather fine, whitish to light brown, erect setae. The antennae are light brown.
