= Aulacoserica minuta =

Scientific classification
- Kingdom: Animalia
- Phylum: Arthropoda
- Clade: Pancrustacea
- Class: Insecta
- Order: Coleoptera
- Suborder: Polyphaga
- Infraorder: Scarabaeiformia
- Family: Scarabaeidae
- Genus: Aulacoserica
- Species: A. minuta

Binomial name
- Aulacoserica minuta Moser, 1918

Species of beetle

Aulacoserica minuta is a species of beetle of the family Scarabaeidae. It is found in the Democratic Republic of the Congo.

== Description ==
Adults reach a length of about 4.5 mm. They are reddish-brown and shiny, with the elytra somewhat darkened. The head is densely punctate. The pronotum is densely punctate and the elytra have rows of punctures, with the intervals moderately densely covered with punctures. The thorax is widely punctate in the middle, becoming more densely punctured laterally. The abdominal segments have a transverse row of setae laterally.
