= Comaserica picticollis =

Scientific classification
- Kingdom: Animalia
- Phylum: Arthropoda
- Class: Insecta
- Order: Coleoptera
- Suborder: Polyphaga
- Infraorder: Scarabaeiformia
- Family: Scarabaeidae
- Genus: Comaserica
- Species: C. picticollis

Binomial name
- Comaserica picticollis (Fairmaire, 1897)

Synonyms
- Homaloplia picticollis Fairmaire, 1897

Species of beetle

Comaserica picticollis is a species of beetle of the family Scarabaeidae. It is found in Madagascar.

== Description ==
Adults reach a length of about 5.6 mm. They are tomentose, silky-glossy, with sparse setae on the pronotum and elytra. The pronotum is yellowish with a greenish spot in the middle, and the elytra deeply ribbed. The pronotum is broad, with a fine row of setae behind the anterior margin, the surface finely and sparsely punctate, the spot roughly M-shaped. The ribs of the elytra are smooth, the rows finely punctate.
