= Pachycnema rostrata =

Scientific classification
- Kingdom: Animalia
- Phylum: Arthropoda
- Class: Insecta
- Order: Coleoptera
- Suborder: Polyphaga
- Infraorder: Scarabaeiformia
- Family: Scarabaeidae
- Genus: Pachycnema
- Species: P. rostrata

Binomial name
- Pachycnema rostrata Burmeister, 1844

Species of beetle

Pachycnema rostrata is a species of beetle of the family Scarabaeidae. It is found in South Africa (Western Cape).

== Description ==
Adults reach a length of about 8–9 mm (0.31–0.35 in). Males are black, while females are dark brown. The pronotum has a scaly outer margin and two patches of scales on each side of the median longitudinal groove. The elytra have three transverse rows of four, three, and two scaly patches on each side, these scales are white in males and yellow in females.
