= Aulacoserica tomentosa =

Scientific classification
- Kingdom: Animalia
- Phylum: Arthropoda
- Class: Insecta
- Order: Coleoptera
- Suborder: Polyphaga
- Infraorder: Scarabaeiformia
- Family: Scarabaeidae
- Genus: Aulacoserica
- Species: A. tomentosa

Binomial name
- Aulacoserica tomentosa Frey, 1966

Species of beetle

Aulacoserica tomentosa is a species of beetle of the family Scarabaeidae. It is found in the Democratic Republic of the Congo.

== Description ==
Adults reach a length of about 8.5 mm. The upper and lower surfaces are blackish-brown and dull, with the upper surface slightly and the underside and pygidium strongly pruinose. The clypeus is moderately glossy. The frons, pronotum, scutellum, and elytra are densely tomentose without discernible punctures or striae. The pygidium has a few shallow punctures and short, erect setae apically.
