= Comaserica costatipennis =

Scientific classification
- Kingdom: Animalia
- Phylum: Arthropoda
- Clade: Pancrustacea
- Class: Insecta
- Order: Coleoptera
- Suborder: Polyphaga
- Infraorder: Scarabaeiformia
- Family: Scarabaeidae
- Genus: Comaserica
- Species: C. costatipennis

Binomial name
- Comaserica costatipennis Moser, 1915

Species of beetle

Comaserica costatipennis is a species of beetle of the family Scarabaeidae. It is found in Madagascar.

== Description ==
Adults reach a length of about 6 mm. They are very thinly tomentose and consequently have a silky sheen. The frons shimmers green and is extensively punctate behind the suture. The antennae are yellowish-brown, with a blackish club. The pronotum has fine, extensive punctation and setate lateral margins. The elytra have rows of punctures. The punctures are faint, but there are a few stronger punctures, which are covered with setae. The spaces between the punctures are strongly convex and puncture-free.
