= Aulacoserica hexaphylla =

Scientific classification
- Kingdom: Animalia
- Phylum: Arthropoda
- Class: Insecta
- Order: Coleoptera
- Suborder: Polyphaga
- Infraorder: Scarabaeiformia
- Family: Scarabaeidae
- Genus: Aulacoserica
- Species: A. hexaphylla

Binomial name
- Aulacoserica hexaphylla Frey, 1974

Species of beetle

Aulacoserica hexaphylla is a species of beetle of the family Scarabaeidae. It is found in Guinea.

== Description ==
Adults reach a length of about 7 mm. The upper and lower surfaces are dark reddish-brown and only slightly shiny. The elytra have very fine striae of punctures.
