= Aulacoserica zumpti =

Scientific classification
- Kingdom: Animalia
- Phylum: Arthropoda
- Class: Insecta
- Order: Coleoptera
- Suborder: Polyphaga
- Infraorder: Scarabaeiformia
- Family: Scarabaeidae
- Genus: Aulacoserica
- Species: A. zumpti

Binomial name
- Aulacoserica zumpti Frey, 1968

Species of beetle

Aulacoserica zumpti is a species of beetle of the family Scarabaeidae. It is found in South Africa (KwaZulu-Natal).

== Description ==
Adults reach a length of about 5 mm. The upper and lower surfaces are light reddish-brown, somewhat shiny and glabrous. The pronotum is moderately finely and densely punctate, while the elytra are very slightly ribbed, but otherwise rather coarsely and densely punctate.
