= Aulacoserica moseri =

Scientific classification
- Kingdom: Animalia
- Phylum: Arthropoda
- Class: Insecta
- Order: Coleoptera
- Suborder: Polyphaga
- Infraorder: Scarabaeiformia
- Family: Scarabaeidae
- Genus: Aulacoserica
- Species: A. moseri

Binomial name
- Aulacoserica moseri Frey, 1968

Species of beetle

Aulacoserica moseri is a species of beetle of the family Scarabaeidae. It is found in Guinea.

== Description ==
Adults reach a length of about 6 mm. The upper and lower surfaces are dark reddish-brown. The pronotum is finely and densely punctate, while the elytra are punctate somewhat more coarsely.
