= Comaserica costifera =

Scientific classification
- Kingdom: Animalia
- Phylum: Arthropoda
- Class: Insecta
- Order: Coleoptera
- Suborder: Polyphaga
- Infraorder: Scarabaeiformia
- Family: Scarabaeidae
- Genus: Comaserica
- Species: C. costifera

Binomial name
- Comaserica costifera Frey, 1975

Species of beetle

Comaserica costifera is a species of beetle of the family Scarabaeidae. It is found in Madagascar.

== Description ==
Adults reach a length of about 4 mm. They have a compact, egg-shaped body. The upper and lower surfaces are reddish-yellow, shiny and somewhat opalescent. The elytra are sparsely and shortly pale-ciliated. The upper surface is glabrous. The pronotum is fairly densely, finely and evenly punctate.
