= Aulacoserica crassa =

Scientific classification
- Kingdom: Animalia
- Phylum: Arthropoda
- Clade: Pancrustacea
- Class: Insecta
- Order: Coleoptera
- Suborder: Polyphaga
- Infraorder: Scarabaeiformia
- Family: Scarabaeidae
- Genus: Aulacoserica
- Species: A. crassa

Binomial name
- Aulacoserica crassa Burgeon, 1943

Species of beetle

Aulacoserica crassa is a species of beetle of the family Scarabaeidae. It is found in the Democratic Republic of the Congo.
