= Comaserica murina =

Scientific classification
- Kingdom: Animalia
- Phylum: Arthropoda
- Class: Insecta
- Order: Coleoptera
- Suborder: Polyphaga
- Infraorder: Scarabaeiformia
- Family: Scarabaeidae
- Genus: Comaserica
- Species: C. murina

Binomial name
- Comaserica murina Frey, 1975

Species of beetle

Comaserica murina is a species of beetle of the family Scarabaeidae. It is found in Madagascar.

== Description ==
Adults reach a length of about 6 mm. They have an egg-shaped body. The upper and lower surfaces are dark brown and (except for the head) dull. The head has sparsely erect, and the pronotum, elytra and pygidium have erect light grey pubescence. The antennae are yellow.
