= Aulacoserica pusilla =

Scientific classification
- Kingdom: Animalia
- Phylum: Arthropoda
- Class: Insecta
- Order: Coleoptera
- Suborder: Polyphaga
- Infraorder: Scarabaeiformia
- Family: Scarabaeidae
- Genus: Aulacoserica
- Species: A. pusilla

Binomial name
- Aulacoserica pusilla Frey, 1968

Species of beetle

Aulacoserica pusilla is a species of beetle of the family Scarabaeidae. It is found in Guinea.

== Description ==
Adults reach a length of about 5-5.2 mm. The upper and lower surfaces are light reddish-brown to dark brown, with the frons and vertex always dark to blackish-brown. The pronotum is very finely and densely punctate and the elytra are moderately finely and densely punctate.
