= Cremnosterna plagiata =

Scientific classification
- Kingdom: Animalia
- Phylum: Arthropoda
- Class: Insecta
- Order: Coleoptera
- Suborder: Polyphaga
- Infraorder: Cucujiformia
- Family: Cerambycidae
- Genus: Cremnosterna
- Species: C. plagiata

Binomial name
- Cremnosterna plagiata (White, 1858)

Synonyms
- Cerosterna plagiata White, 1858

Species of beetle

Cremnosterna plagiata is a species of beetle in the family Cerambycidae. It was described by White in 1858. It is known from Myanmar, Malaysia, India, and Thailand.

== Varietas ==
- Cremnosterna plagiata var. maculicornis (Thomson, 1865)
- Cremnosterna plagiata var. reducta Breuning, 1943
