= Aulacoserica nimbana =

Scientific classification
- Kingdom: Animalia
- Phylum: Arthropoda
- Class: Insecta
- Order: Coleoptera
- Suborder: Polyphaga
- Infraorder: Scarabaeiformia
- Family: Scarabaeidae
- Genus: Aulacoserica
- Species: A. nimbana

Binomial name
- Aulacoserica nimbana Frey, 1970

Species of beetle

Aulacoserica nimbana is a species of beetle of the family Scarabaeidae. It is found in Guinea.

== Description ==
Adults reach a length of about 8 mm. The upper and lower surfaces are dark reddish-brown, shiny and glabrous. The clypeus is densely and rugosely punctate, while the pronotum is very densely and rather finely punctate. The elytra have rows of punctures and between these rows they are irregularly, rather densely and moderately finely punctate.
