= Pachycnema =

Scientific classification
- Kingdom: Animalia
- Phylum: Arthropoda
- Class: Insecta
- Order: Coleoptera
- Suborder: Polyphaga
- Infraorder: Scarabaeiformia
- Family: Scarabaeidae
- Subfamily: Melolonthinae
- Tribe: Hopliini
- Genus: Pachycnema; Le Peletier & Audinet-Serville, 1828

Synonyms
- Pachycnema (Pachycnemula) Schein, 1959; Pachypus Billberg, 1820; Pachycnemida Péringuey, 1902; Stenocnema Burmeister, 1844

Genus beetles

Pachycnema is a genus of beetles belonging to the family Scarabaeidae.

== Species ==
- subgenus Macacoplia Cupello & Ribeiro-Costa, 2019
  - Pachycnema abdominalis (Burmeister, 1844)
  - Pachycnema albosquamosa Dombrow, 1998
  - Pachycnema ferruginea Dombrow, 1998
  - Pachycnema kochi Schein, 1959
  - Pachycnema lineola Burmeister, 1844
  - Pachycnema marginella (Fabricius, 1792)
  - Pachycnema moerens Péringuey, 1902
  - Pachycnema namaqua Péringuey, 1902
  - Pachycnema rostrata Burmeister, 1844
  - Pachycnema saga Péringuey, 1902
  - Pachycnema schoenherri Dombrow, 1998
  - Pachycnema tibialis (Olivier, 1789)
- subgenus Pachycnema
  - Pachycnema albomaculata Dombrow, 1998
  - Pachycnema alternans Burmeister, 1844
  - Pachycnema crassipes (Fabricius, 1775)
  - Pachycnema danieli Schein, 1959
  - Pachycnema flavovittata Dombrow, 1998
  - Pachycnema luteoguttata Schein, 1959
  - Pachycnema melanospila Burmeister, 1844
  - Pachycnema murina Burmeister, 1844
  - Pachycnema nubila Schein, 1959
  - Pachycnema pulverulenta Burmeister, 1844
  - Pachycnema scholtzi Dombrow, 1998
  - Pachycnema ulrichi Dombrow, 1998
- subgenus Physocnema Burmeister, 1844
  - Pachycnema calcarata Burmeister, 1844
  - Pachycnema calviniana Schein, 1959
  - Pachycnema colvillei Dombrow, 1999
  - Pachycnema endroedyi Dombrow, 1998
  - Pachycnema flavolineata Burmeister, 1844
  - Pachycnema multiguttata (Thunberg, 1818)
  - Pachycnema nikolaji Dombrow, 1998
  - Pachycnema singularis Péringuey, 1902
- subgenus Stenocnema Burmeister, 1844
  - Pachycnema pudibunda (Burmeister, 1844)
