= Aulacoserica facilis =

Scientific classification
- Kingdom: Animalia
- Phylum: Arthropoda
- Class: Insecta
- Order: Coleoptera
- Suborder: Polyphaga
- Infraorder: Scarabaeiformia
- Family: Scarabaeidae
- Genus: Aulacoserica
- Species: A. facilis

Binomial name
- Aulacoserica facilis Brenske, 1902

Species of beetle

Aulacoserica facilis is a species of beetle of the family Scarabaeidae. It is found in Tanzania.

== Description ==
Adults reach a length of about 6 mm. They are yellowish-brown and shiny, with only a very faint silky sheen. The pronotum is finely and densely punctate. The elytra are punctate in distinct rows.
