= Pachycnema singularis =

Scientific classification
- Kingdom: Animalia
- Phylum: Arthropoda
- Class: Insecta
- Order: Coleoptera
- Suborder: Polyphaga
- Infraorder: Scarabaeiformia
- Family: Scarabaeidae
- Genus: Pachycnema
- Species: P. singularis

Binomial name
- Pachycnema singularis Péringuey, 1902

Species of beetle

Pachycnema singularis is a species of beetle of the family Scarabaeidae. It is found in South Africa (Western Cape, Northern Cape).

== Description ==
Adults reach a length of about 8.5 mm (0.33 in). The head and pronotum are black, while the elytra are dark piceous red (nearly black). The pronotum and elytra are sprinkled with not closely set, elongate white scales. Females are black, with the elytra very dark brown, almost piceous or testaceous red and the pronotum without scales except in the anterior angles of the front margin.
