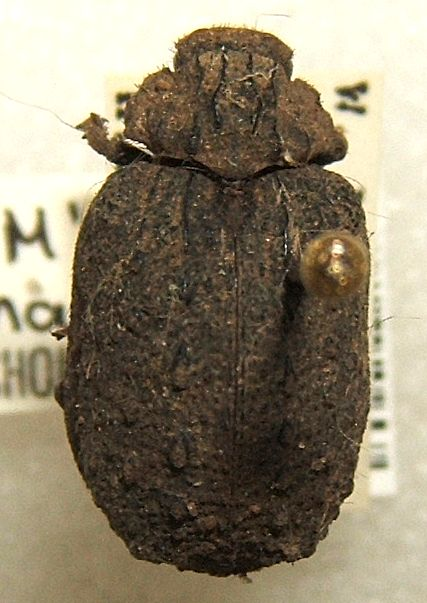
- Omorgus alternans, adult

Scientific classification
- Kingdom: Animalia
- Phylum: Arthropoda
- Class: Insecta
- Order: Coleoptera
- Suborder: Polyphaga
- Infraorder: Scarabaeiformia
- Family: Trogidae
- Genus: Omorgus
- Species: O. alternans

Binomial name
- Omorgus alternans (MacLeay, 1827)

Synonyms
- Trox alternans

= Omorgus alternans =

Species of beetle

Omorgus alternans is a beetle of the family Trogidae found in Australia.
