= Comaserica conspurcata =

Scientific classification
- Kingdom: Animalia
- Phylum: Arthropoda
- Class: Insecta
- Order: Coleoptera
- Suborder: Polyphaga
- Infraorder: Scarabaeiformia
- Family: Scarabaeidae
- Genus: Comaserica
- Species: C. conspurcata

Binomial name
- Comaserica conspurcata (Blanchard, 1850)

Synonyms
- Emphania conspurcata Blanchard, 1850

Species of beetle

Comaserica conspurcata is a species of beetle of the family Scarabaeidae. It is found in Madagascar.

== Description ==
Adults reach a length of about 7 mm. They are very similar to Comaserica irrorata, but may be distinguished by the antennae, by the pygidium with setate punctures at the tip, and by the hind coxae, which have only one row of setae on the sides. They have an elongate-oval, narrow, dull, reddish-brown with yellowish, darkly spotted elytra, on which the yellowish-white setae stand out clearly.
