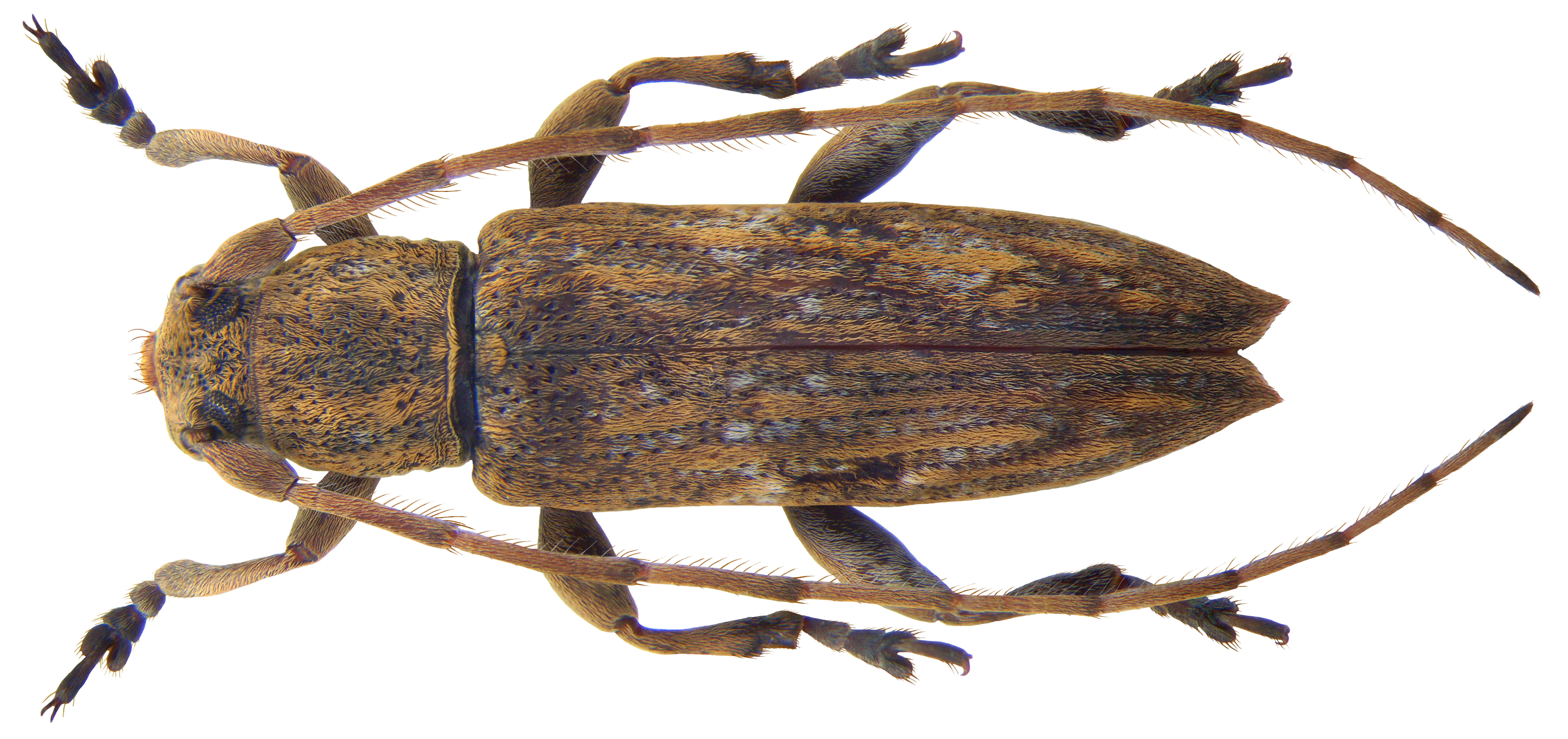

Scientific classification
- Domain: Eukaryota
- Kingdom: Animalia
- Phylum: Arthropoda
- Class: Insecta
- Order: Coleoptera
- Suborder: Polyphaga
- Infraorder: Cucujiformia
- Family: Cerambycidae
- Genus: Sybra
- Species: S. alternans

Binomial name
- Sybra alternans (Wiedemann, 1823)

Synonyms
- Atelais multilineata Pic, 1927; Falsoropica javaensis Breuning, 1982; Lamia alternans Wiedemann, 1823; Sybra carolina Matshushita, 1935; Sybra fuscobiplagiata Breuning, 1939; Sybra fuscovittata Aurivillius, 1927

= Sybra alternans =

Species of beetle

Sybra alternans is a species of beetle in the family Cerambycidae. It was described by Wiedemann in 1823. It is known from Myanmar, Thailand, Laos, Cambodia, Vietnam, Malaysia, Taiwan, Indonesia, Mariana Islands, Caroline Islands, Marshall Islands, and the Philippines. It was introduced in Hawaii in 1917, as well as Florida. Its diet includes plants such as Ananas comosus, Canavalia ensiformis, Musa × paradisiaca, Ocimum basilicum, Phaseolus vulgaris, Pittosporum tobira, Vachellia farnesiana, and Xanthium strumarium.
