= Sybra discomaculata =

Scientific classification
- Kingdom: Animalia
- Phylum: Arthropoda
- Class: Insecta
- Order: Coleoptera
- Suborder: Polyphaga
- Infraorder: Cucujiformia
- Family: Cerambycidae
- Genus: Sybra
- Species: S. discomaculata

Binomial name
- Sybra discomaculata Breuning, 1950

Synonyms
- Sybra alternans m. discomaculata Breuning, 1950

Species of beetle

Sybra discomaculata is a species of beetle in the family Cerambycidae. It was described by Stephan von Breuning in 1950.
