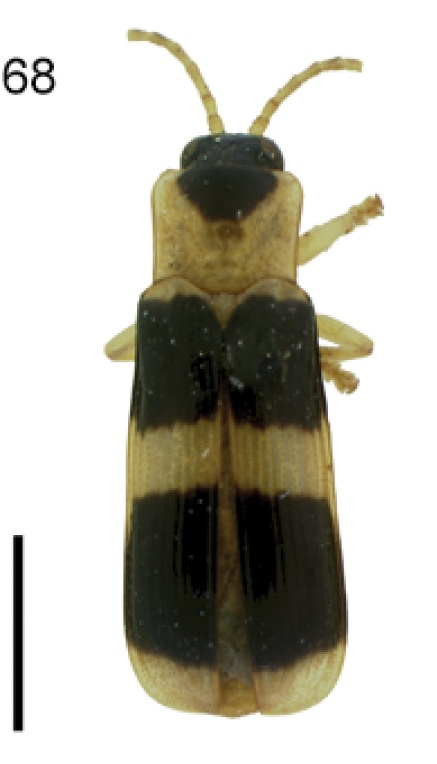

Scientific classification
- Kingdom: Animalia
- Phylum: Arthropoda
- Class: Insecta
- Order: Coleoptera
- Suborder: Polyphaga
- Infraorder: Cucujiformia
- Family: Chrysomelidae
- Genus: Cephaloleia
- Species: C. alternans

Binomial name
- Cephaloleia alternans Waterhouse, 1881

= Cephaloleia alternans =

Species of beetle

Cephaloleia alternans is a species of beetle of the family Chrysomelidae. It is found in Ecuador and Peru.

== Description ==
Adults reach a length of about 8.8–9.2 mm. They have a yellow body, the head with the vertex black. The pronotum is yellow with a black trapezoidal macula on the middle of the anterior margin and the elytron is yellow with a transverse black band near the base and another on the apical one-third.

== Biology ==
The hostplant is unknown, but adults have been collected on Calathea lanata.
