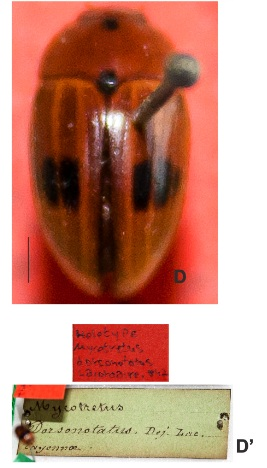

Scientific classification
- Kingdom: Animalia
- Phylum: Arthropoda
- Class: Insecta
- Order: Coleoptera
- Suborder: Polyphaga
- Infraorder: Cucujiformia
- Family: Erotylidae
- Genus: Mycotretus
- Species: M. dorsonotatus

Binomial name
- Mycotretus dorsonotatus Lacordaire, 1842

Synonyms
- Mycotretus alternans Gorham, 1888; Mycotretus quadristriolatus Kuhnt, 1910

= Mycotretus dorsonotatus =

Species of beetle

Mycotretus dorsonotatus is a species of beetle of the Erotylidae family. This species is found in Guiana, French Guiana, Peru, Panama and northern and central-western Brazil.
