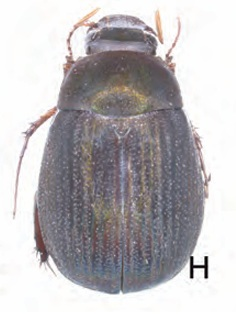

Scientific classification
- Kingdom: Animalia
- Phylum: Arthropoda
- Class: Insecta
- Order: Coleoptera
- Suborder: Polyphaga
- Infraorder: Scarabaeiformia
- Family: Scarabaeidae
- Genus: Maladera
- Species: M. burmeisteri

Binomial name
- Maladera burmeisteri (Brenske, 1898)

Synonyms
- Autoserica burmeisteri Brenske, 1898; Autoserica alternans Frey, 1975

= Maladera burmeisteri =

Species of beetle

Maladera burmeisteri is a species of beetle of the family Scarabaeidae. It is found in India (Chhattisgarh, Madhya Pradesh, West Bengal, Uttarakhand, Goa, Karnataka, Kerala, Maharashtra, Tamil Nadu) and Nepal.

== Description ==
Adults reach a length of about 7.4–9.8 mm. They have a dark brown, oval body. The dorsal surface is mostly dull and nearly glabrous, except for the setae of the lateral margins of the pronotum and elytra.

== Subspecies ==
- Maladera burmeisteri burmeisteri (India [Chhattisgarh, Madhya Pradesh, West Bengal, Uttarakhand] and Nepal)
- Maladera burmeisteri alternans (Frey, 1975) (Goa, Karnataka, Kerala, Madhya Pradesh, Maharashtra, Tamil Nadu)
