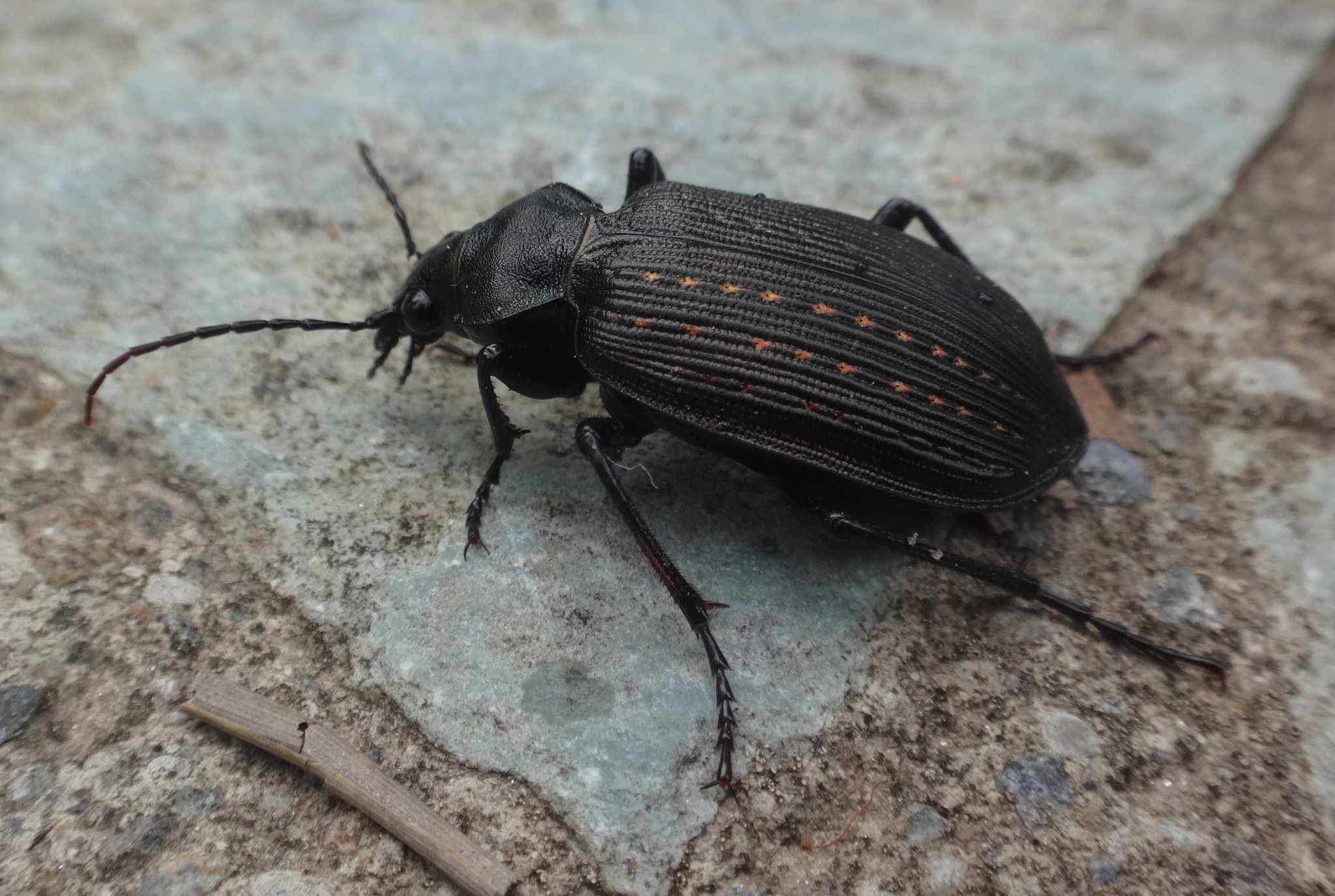

Scientific classification
- Kingdom: Animalia
- Phylum: Arthropoda
- Clade: Pancrustacea
- Class: Insecta
- Order: Coleoptera
- Suborder: Adephaga
- Family: Carabidae
- Subfamily: Carabinae
- Tribe: Carabini
- Genus: Calosoma
- Species: C. alternans

Binomial name
- Calosoma alternans (Fabricius, 1792)

Synonyms
- Carabus alternans Fabricius, 1792; Calosoma granulatum Perty, 1830; Callistriga coxalis Motschulsky, 1866; Calosoma armatum Reiche, 1843; Calosoma orbignyi Géhin, 1885; Calamata rugata Motschulsky, 1866; Calosoma brullei Blanchard, 1843; Calosoma imbricatum Brullé, 1838

= Calosoma alternans =

Species of beetle

Calosoma alternans, the reciprocal caterpillar hunter, is a species of ground beetle in the family Carabidae. It is found in Central and South America, where it may be found in various habitats, such as tropical dry and moist forests, grasslands and cultivated fields.

Adults prey on Alabama argillacea and Spodoptera frugiperda.

== Subspecies ==
These two subspecies belong to the species Calosoma alternans:

- Calosoma alternans alternans (Fabricius, 1792) (Colombia, the Lesser Antilles, Mexico, and Venezuela)
- Calosoma alternans granulatum Perty, 1830 (Argentina, Brazil, and Uruguay)
