= Raphitoma alternans =

Scientific classification
- Kingdom: Animalia
- Phylum: Mollusca
- Class: Gastropoda
- Subclass: Caenogastropoda
- Order: Neogastropoda
- Superfamily: Conoidea
- Family: Raphitomidae
- Genus: Raphitoma
- Species: R. alternans

Binomial name
- Raphitoma alternans (Monterosato, 1884)

Synonyms
- Defrancia alternans Paetel, 1888; Philbertia alternans Monterosato, 1884 (original combination); Raphitoma (Raphitoma) bucquoyi Locard, E.A.A., 1886; Raphitoma (Raphitoma) bucquoyi sfaxiana Nordsieck, F., 1977

Species of gastropod

Raphitoma alternans is a species of sea snail, a marine gastropod mollusc in the family Raphitomidae.

== Description ==
The length of the shell reaches a length of 10 mm. It has a paucispiral protoconch.

== Distribution ==
This marine species occurs in the Central and Eastern Mediterranean Sea.
