= Cryptocephalus alternans =

Scientific classification
- Kingdom: Animalia
- Phylum: Arthropoda
- Clade: Pancrustacea
- Class: Insecta
- Order: Coleoptera
- Suborder: Polyphaga
- Infraorder: Cucujiformia
- Family: Chrysomelidae
- Genus: Cryptocephalus
- Species: C. alternans

Binomial name
- Cryptocephalus alternans Suffrian, 1852

Species of beetle

Cryptocephalus alternans is a species of case-bearing leaf beetle in the family Chrysomelidae. It is found in the Middle America (Mexico) and the Southwestern United States (California, Arizona).

== Subspecies ==
These two subspecies belong to the species Cryptocephalus alternans:

- Cryptocephalus alternans alternans Suffrian, 1852
- Cryptocephalus alternans jungovittatus R. White, 1968

Cryptocephalus alternans jungovittatus measures 4.7–5.0 mm (0.19–0.20 in) in length.
