= Comaserica alternans =

Scientific classification
- Kingdom: Animalia
- Phylum: Arthropoda
- Clade: Pancrustacea
- Class: Insecta
- Order: Coleoptera
- Suborder: Polyphaga
- Infraorder: Scarabaeiformia
- Family: Scarabaeidae
- Genus: Comaserica
- Species: C. alternans

Binomial name
- Comaserica alternans Moser, 1915

Species of beetle

Comaserica alternans is a species of beetle of the family Scarabaeidae. It is found in Madagascar.

== Description ==
Adults reach a length of about 5 mm. The frons is green, widely punctate and covered with individual setae. The pronotum is yellowish-brown and shows three indistinctly defined green spots in the middle. It has fine punctation and scattered yellow setae. The elytra are yellowish-brown and covered with blackish or brownish spots. There are rows of punctures, and the unpunctured interstices are alternately flat and convex. Numerous long yellow setae are also present, particularly in the posterior part of the elytra.
