= Aulacoserica nyansana =

Scientific classification
- Kingdom: Animalia
- Phylum: Arthropoda
- Class: Insecta
- Order: Coleoptera
- Suborder: Polyphaga
- Infraorder: Scarabaeiformia
- Family: Scarabaeidae
- Genus: Aulacoserica
- Species: A. nyansana

Binomial name
- Aulacoserica nyansana Brenske, 1902

Species of beetle

Aulacoserica nyansana is a species of beetle of the family Scarabaeidae. It is found in Tanzania.

== Description ==
Adults reach a length of about 5.5 mm. They are very shiny, somewhat yellowish with a redder head and thorax. The elytra are distinctly punctate in rows.
