= Cremnosterna alternans =

Scientific classification
- Kingdom: Animalia
- Phylum: Arthropoda
- Class: Insecta
- Order: Coleoptera
- Suborder: Polyphaga
- Infraorder: Cucujiformia
- Family: Cerambycidae
- Genus: Cremnosterna
- Species: C. alternans

Binomial name
- Cremnosterna alternans Breuning & Itzinger, 1943

Species of beetle

Cremnosterna alternans is a species of beetle in the family Cerambycidae. It was described by Stephan von Breuning and Itzinger in 1943.
