= Comaserica discolor =

Scientific classification
- Kingdom: Animalia
- Phylum: Arthropoda
- Clade: Pancrustacea
- Class: Insecta
- Order: Coleoptera
- Suborder: Polyphaga
- Infraorder: Scarabaeiformia
- Family: Scarabaeidae
- Genus: Comaserica
- Species: C. discolor

Binomial name
- Comaserica discolor Brenske, 1900

Species of beetle

Comaserica discolor is a species of beetle of the family Scarabaeidae. It is found in Madagascar.

== Description ==
Adults reach a length of about 4.5 mm. They are dull with a silky sheen. The frons finely punctate. The pronotum has three dark, greenish bands on the surface, converging at the anterior margin. On the elytra, the second and fourth ribs are more strongly raised, and there are distinct white setae.
