= Aulacoserica alternans =

Scientific classification
- Kingdom: Animalia
- Phylum: Arthropoda
- Clade: Pancrustacea
- Class: Insecta
- Order: Coleoptera
- Suborder: Polyphaga
- Infraorder: Scarabaeiformia
- Family: Scarabaeidae
- Genus: Aulacoserica
- Species: A. alternans

Binomial name
- Aulacoserica alternans Frey, 1968

Species of beetle

Aulacoserica alternans is a species of beetle of the family Scarabaeidae. It is found in Zambia.

== Description ==
Adults reach a length of about 7 mm. The upper and lower surfaces are light reddish-brown, slightly shiny and glabrous. The pronotum is densely and moderately punctate, while the elytra are somewhat more coarsely and densely punctate, with indistinct rows of punctures.
