= Comaserica crinita =

Scientific classification
- Kingdom: Animalia
- Phylum: Arthropoda
- Class: Insecta
- Order: Coleoptera
- Suborder: Polyphaga
- Infraorder: Scarabaeiformia
- Family: Scarabaeidae
- Genus: Comaserica
- Species: C. crinita

Binomial name
- Comaserica crinita (Burmeister, 1855)

Synonyms
- Serica crinita Burmeister, 1855

Species of beetle

Comaserica crinita is a species of beetle of the family Scarabaeidae. It is found in Madagascar.

== Description ==
Adults reach a length of about 8-9.5 mm. They are brown, very dull, with a slight opalescent sheen above, but silky and white setae below. The clypeus is rather rounded anteriorly, broadly margined, very densely wrinkled-punctate, with distinct setate punctures, and a metallic sheen extending beyond the suture. The frons is covered behind the suture with individual strong setate punctures, between which are very finely and widely spaced punctures. The pronotum is finely punctured, with individual weak setate punctures. On the posterior margin, opposite the scutellum, is a brush-like row of short hairs. The elytra are distinctly raised and narrowly striated, the first stria next to the suture fading from the middle to the base, densely punctured within the striae with distinct setate punctures. The ribs are unpunctate, and conspicuously densely bristle-bearing along the lateral margin from the middle onwards, finely pubescent at the base, with a distinct group of setae at the apex of the inner angle. The pygidium has short hairs and long, protruding setae.
