= Pachycnema danieli =

Scientific classification
- Kingdom: Animalia
- Phylum: Arthropoda
- Class: Insecta
- Order: Coleoptera
- Suborder: Polyphaga
- Infraorder: Scarabaeiformia
- Family: Scarabaeidae
- Genus: Pachycnema
- Species: P. danieli

Binomial name
- Pachycnema danieli Schein, 1959

Species of beetle

Pachycnema danieli is a species of beetle of the family Scarabaeidae. It is found in South Africa (Northern Cape).

== Description ==
Adults reach a length of about 8 mm (0.31 in). They are black, with dark reddish-brown, very sparsely scaled elytra. In males, the pygidial part and abdomen are scaled, while they are hairy in females.

== Etymology ==
The species is dedicated to Mr. Franz Daniel of the Munich Museum.
