= Pachycnema marginella =

Scientific classification
- Kingdom: Animalia
- Phylum: Arthropoda
- Clade: Pancrustacea
- Class: Insecta
- Order: Coleoptera
- Suborder: Polyphaga
- Infraorder: Scarabaeiformia
- Family: Scarabaeidae
- Genus: Pachycnema
- Species: P. marginella

Binomial name
- Pachycnema marginella (Fabricius, 1792)

Synonyms
- Melolontha marginella Fabricius, 1792

Species of beetle

Pachycnema marginella is a species of beetle of the family Scarabaeidae. It is found in South Africa (Western Cape, Eastern Cape).

== Description ==
Adults reach a length of about 9–10.5 mm (0.35–0.41 in). The head and pronotum are black, the latter with a margin of yellow scales all round, and on the disk four round scaly spots. The scutellum is covered with yellow scales and the elytra are brownish red, opaque, and with a small patch of yellow scales under the humeral callus, near the outer margin. The abdomen and pygidium are clothed with yellow scales, which are whitish on the abdomen. The legs are black.
