= Pachycnema namaqua =

Scientific classification
- Kingdom: Animalia
- Phylum: Arthropoda
- Class: Insecta
- Order: Coleoptera
- Suborder: Polyphaga
- Infraorder: Scarabaeiformia
- Family: Scarabaeidae
- Genus: Pachycnema
- Species: P. namaqua

Binomial name
- Pachycnema namaqua Péringuey, 1902

Species of beetle

Pachycnema namaqua is a species of beetle of the family Scarabaeidae. It is found in South Africa (Northern Cape).

== Description ==
Adults reach a length of about 8–10 mm (0.31–0.39 in). The head and pronotum are black, the latter with an ill-defined marginal band of white scales, and with four, somewhat indistinct, and often obliterated small round patches. The elytra are red and shining and the legs are black. In females, there is a broadly interrupted supra-marginal band, and a small patch along the suture of yellow scales, while in males there are only a few white scales here and there. The pygidium is white in males and has a broad, basal, transverse black band. The pygidium is yellow in females, and there is no trace of a black transverse band.
