= Pachycnema alternans =

Scientific classification
- Kingdom: Animalia
- Phylum: Arthropoda
- Class: Insecta
- Order: Coleoptera
- Suborder: Polyphaga
- Infraorder: Scarabaeiformia
- Family: Scarabaeidae
- Genus: Pachycnema
- Species: P. alternans

Binomial name
- Pachycnema alternans Burmeister, 1844

Species of beetle

Pachycnema alternans is a species of beetle of the family Scarabaeidae. It is found in South Africa (Western Cape, Northern Cape).

== Description ==
Adults reach a length of about 9–10.5 mm (0.35–0.41 in). The head and pronotum are black, while the elytra are reddish in both sexes. The pronotum has a marginal band of yellowish white scales, a median longitudinal line and three spots on each side of it. The elytra have three longitudinal bands of similar scales. The pygidium is clothed with yellow scales and the head is clothed with black hairs.
