= Comaserica irrorata =

Scientific classification
- Kingdom: Animalia
- Phylum: Arthropoda
- Class: Insecta
- Order: Coleoptera
- Suborder: Polyphaga
- Infraorder: Scarabaeiformia
- Family: Scarabaeidae
- Genus: Comaserica
- Species: C. irrorata

Binomial name
- Comaserica irrorata (Blanchard, 1850)

Synonyms
- Emphania irrorata Blanchard, 1850

Species of beetle

Comaserica irrorata is a species of beetle of the family Scarabaeidae. It is found in Madagascar.

== Description ==
Adults reach a length of about 8.2 mm. The clypeus is almost square, the corners rounded, the anterior margin straight, densely wrinkled and punctate with numerous setae. The frons is finely punctate, slightly depressed on both sides near the middle, with individual setae in very faint punctures at the suture. The pronotum is slightly projecting forward in the middle, the posterior angles very broadly rounded, densely tomentose with scattered setate punctures. The scutellum is slightly rounded at the apex with white setate hairs. The elytra are brown with small blackish, smooth spots, which are located on the narrow, alternately raised ribs. The first row of spots consists of smaller spots, those of the 2nd, 3rd, and 4th rows are somewhat larger, those of the 5th row smaller. The punctation is fine and dense with numerous setate punctures, which are located on the ribs and which are clearly visible even when the seta is absent. The pygidium is dull, slightly uneven, finely punctate at the tip, with numerous, more delicate setate punctures at the base. The underside is silky-white.
