= Aulacoserica castanea =

Scientific classification
- Kingdom: Animalia
- Phylum: Arthropoda
- Clade: Pancrustacea
- Class: Insecta
- Order: Coleoptera
- Suborder: Polyphaga
- Infraorder: Scarabaeiformia
- Family: Scarabaeidae
- Genus: Aulacoserica
- Species: A. castanea

Binomial name
- Aulacoserica castanea Moser, 1918

Species of beetle

Aulacoserica castanea is a species of beetle of the family Scarabaeidae. It is found in Cameroon and the Republic of the Congo.

== Description ==
Adults reach a length of about 7.5 mm. They are reddish-brown and shiny. The head is densely punctured and the antennae are reddish-yellow. The pronotum is rather densely punctured and the elytra have rows of punctures, with the intervals moderately densely punctured. The underside is widely and finely punctate in the middle and more densely and strongly punctate at the sides.
