= Mastax tessmanni =

Scientific classification
- Kingdom: Animalia
- Phylum: Arthropoda
- Clade: Pancrustacea
- Class: Insecta
- Order: Coleoptera
- Suborder: Adephaga
- Family: Carabidae
- Subfamily: Brachininae
- Tribe: Brachinini
- Genus: Mastax
- Species: M. tessmanni

Binomial name
- Mastax tessmanni Liebke, 1934

Species of beetle

Mastax tessmanni is a species of beetle in the family Carabidae found in Cameroon, Chade, Democratic Republic of the Congo and Uganda. It was described by Liebke in 1934.
