= M. nepalensis =

M. nepalensis may refer to:

- Mahonia nepalensis, an evergreen shrub
- Mallinella nepalensis, an ant spider
- Mastax nepalensis, a ground beetle
- Meconopsis nepalensis, a plant containing beta-Carbolines
- Medasina nepalensis, an Asian moth
- Melittia nepalensis, a clearwing moth
- Microzargus nepalensis, a ground beetle
- Mimocolliuris nepalensis, a ground beetle
- Monocercops nepalensis, a Nepalese moth
- Mordellistena nepalensis, a tumbling flower beetle
- Musa nepalensis, a plant native to Asia
