= Mastax royi =

Scientific classification
- Kingdom: Animalia
- Phylum: Arthropoda
- Clade: Pancrustacea
- Class: Insecta
- Order: Coleoptera
- Suborder: Adephaga
- Family: Carabidae
- Subfamily: Brachininae
- Tribe: Brachinini
- Genus: Mastax
- Species: M. royi

Binomial name
- Mastax royi Basilewsky, 1969

Species of beetle

Mastax royi is a species of beetle in the family Carabidae that can be found in Ivory Coast and Senegal.
