= Mastax subornatella =

Scientific classification
- Kingdom: Animalia
- Phylum: Arthropoda
- Clade: Pancrustacea
- Class: Insecta
- Order: Coleoptera
- Suborder: Adephaga
- Family: Carabidae
- Subfamily: Brachininae
- Tribe: Brachinini
- Genus: Mastax
- Species: M. subornatella

Binomial name
- Mastax subornatella Basilewsky, 1958

Species of beetle

Mastax subornatella is a species of beetle in the family Carabidae found in Angola, Namibia, South Africa and Zambia.
