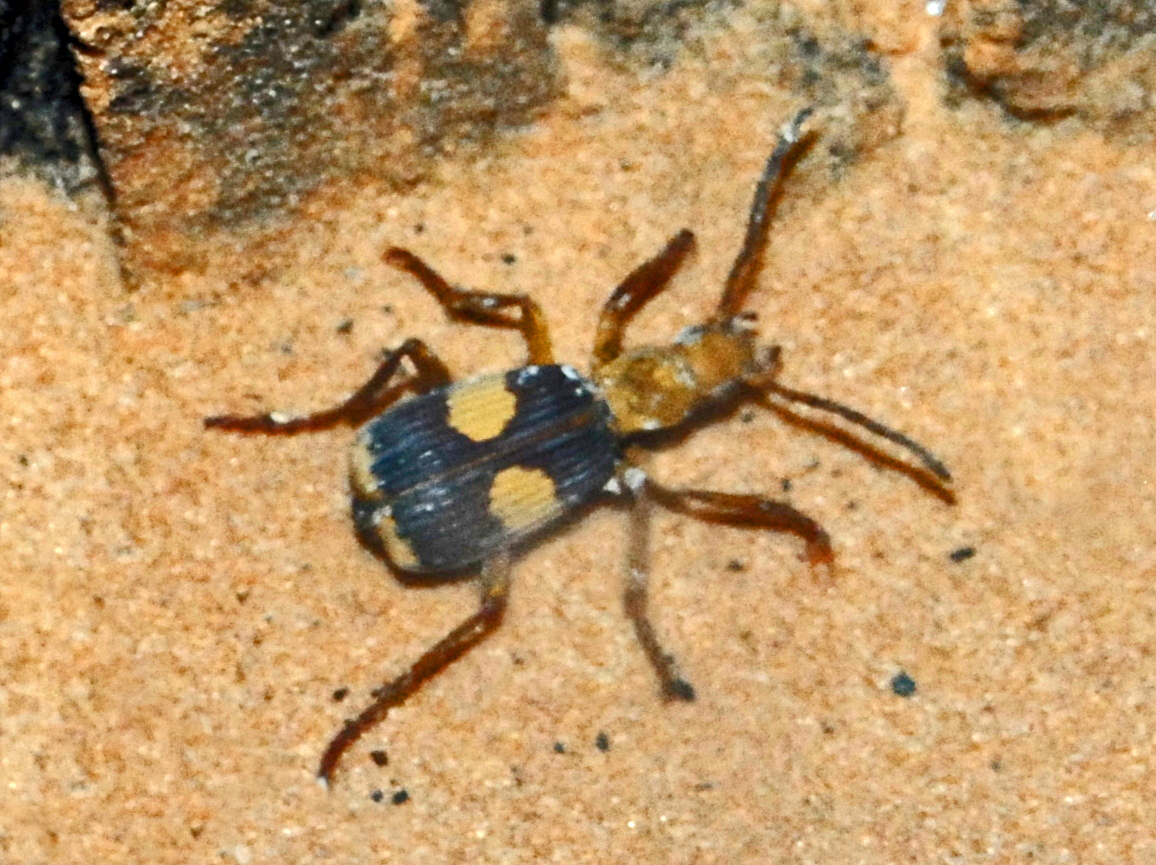
- Pheropsophus africanus

Scientific classification
- Kingdom: Animalia
- Phylum: Arthropoda
- Class: Insecta
- Order: Coleoptera
- Suborder: Adephaga
- Family: Carabidae
- Subfamily: Brachininae
- Tribe: Brachinini
- Genus: Pheropsophus
- Species: P. africanus

Binomial name
- Pheropsophus africanus (Dejean, 1825)

= Pheropsophus africanus =

Species of beetle

Pheropsophus africanus is a species of ground beetles belonging to the family Carabidae.

== Description ==
Pheropsophus africanus can reach a length of 13–16 millimetres (0.51–0.63 in). These beetles show bright reddish head, pronotum and legs and two yellow/orange spots and a slight yellow/orange band on the edge of dark brown elytra.

== Distribution ==
This species is present in the subdesertic regions of Algeria, Egypt (Sinai), India, Iran, Iraq, Israel, Jordan, Libya, Morocco, Tunisia, Saudi Arabia, the United Arab Emirates, Oman, and Yemen.
