= Mastax nana =

Scientific classification
- Kingdom: Animalia
- Phylum: Arthropoda
- Clade: Pancrustacea
- Class: Insecta
- Order: Coleoptera
- Suborder: Adephaga
- Family: Carabidae
- Subfamily: Brachininae
- Tribe: Brachinini
- Genus: Mastax
- Species: M. nana

Binomial name
- Mastax nana Basilewsky, 1949

Species of beetle

Mastax nana is a species of beetle in the family Carabidae found in Chad, Mali and Democratic Republic of the Congo.
