= Mastax parreysii =

Scientific classification
- Kingdom: Animalia
- Phylum: Arthropoda
- Clade: Pancrustacea
- Class: Insecta
- Order: Coleoptera
- Suborder: Adephaga
- Family: Carabidae
- Subfamily: Brachininae
- Tribe: Brachinini
- Genus: Mastax
- Species: M. parreysii

Binomial name
- Mastax parreysii Chaudoir, 1850

Synonyms
- Mastax parreyssi

Species of beetle

Mastax parreysii is a species in the beetle family Carabidae. It is found in Africa and the Middle East.
