= Mastax poecila =

Scientific classification
- Kingdom: Animalia
- Phylum: Arthropoda
- Clade: Pancrustacea
- Class: Insecta
- Order: Coleoptera
- Suborder: Adephaga
- Family: Carabidae
- Subfamily: Brachininae
- Tribe: Brachinini
- Genus: Mastax
- Species: M. poecila

Binomial name
- Mastax poecila Schaum, 1863

Species of beetle

Mastax poecila is a species of beetle in the family Carabidae found in Cambodia, China and Singapore.
