= Mastax fortesculpta =

Scientific classification
- Kingdom: Animalia
- Phylum: Arthropoda
- Clade: Pancrustacea
- Class: Insecta
- Order: Coleoptera
- Suborder: Adephaga
- Family: Carabidae
- Genus: Mastax
- Species: M. fortesculpta

Binomial name
- Mastax fortesculpta Basilewsky, 1988

Species of beetle

Mastax fortesculpta is a species of beetle in the family Carabidae with restricted distribution in Zambia.
