= Crepidogastrillus =

Scientific classification
- Domain: Eukaryota
- Kingdom: Animalia
- Phylum: Arthropoda
- Class: Insecta
- Order: Coleoptera
- Suborder: Adephaga
- Family: Carabidae
- Subfamily: Brachininae
- Tribe: Crepidogastrini
- Genus: Crepidogastrillus; Basilewsky, 1959
- Species: C. curtulus

Binomial name
- Crepidogastrillus curtulus Basilewsky, 1959

Species of beetle

Crepidogastrillus is a genus in the ground beetle family Carabidae. This genus has a single species, Crepidogastrillus curtulus. It is found in Namibia and South Africa.
