= Crepidonellus =

Scientific classification
- Domain: Eukaryota
- Kingdom: Animalia
- Phylum: Arthropoda
- Class: Insecta
- Order: Coleoptera
- Suborder: Adephaga
- Family: Carabidae
- Subfamily: Brachininae
- Tribe: Crepidogastrini
- Genus: Crepidonellus; Basilewsky, 1959

Subgenera
- Crepidonellus Basilewsky, 1959; Crepidostenus Basilewsky, 1988

Genus of beetles

Crepidonellus is a genus in the beetle family Carabidae. There are about five described species in Crepidonellus.

== Species ==
These five species belong to the genus Crepidonellus:

- Crepidonellus endroedyi Basilewsky, 1975 (Namibia)
- Crepidonellus latipalpis Basilewsky, 1988 (South Africa)
- Crepidonellus nigromaculatus Basilewsky, 1959 (South Africa)
- Crepidonellus pusillus (Péringuey, 1888) (South Africa)
- Crepidonellus youngai Basilewsky, 1988 (South Africa)
