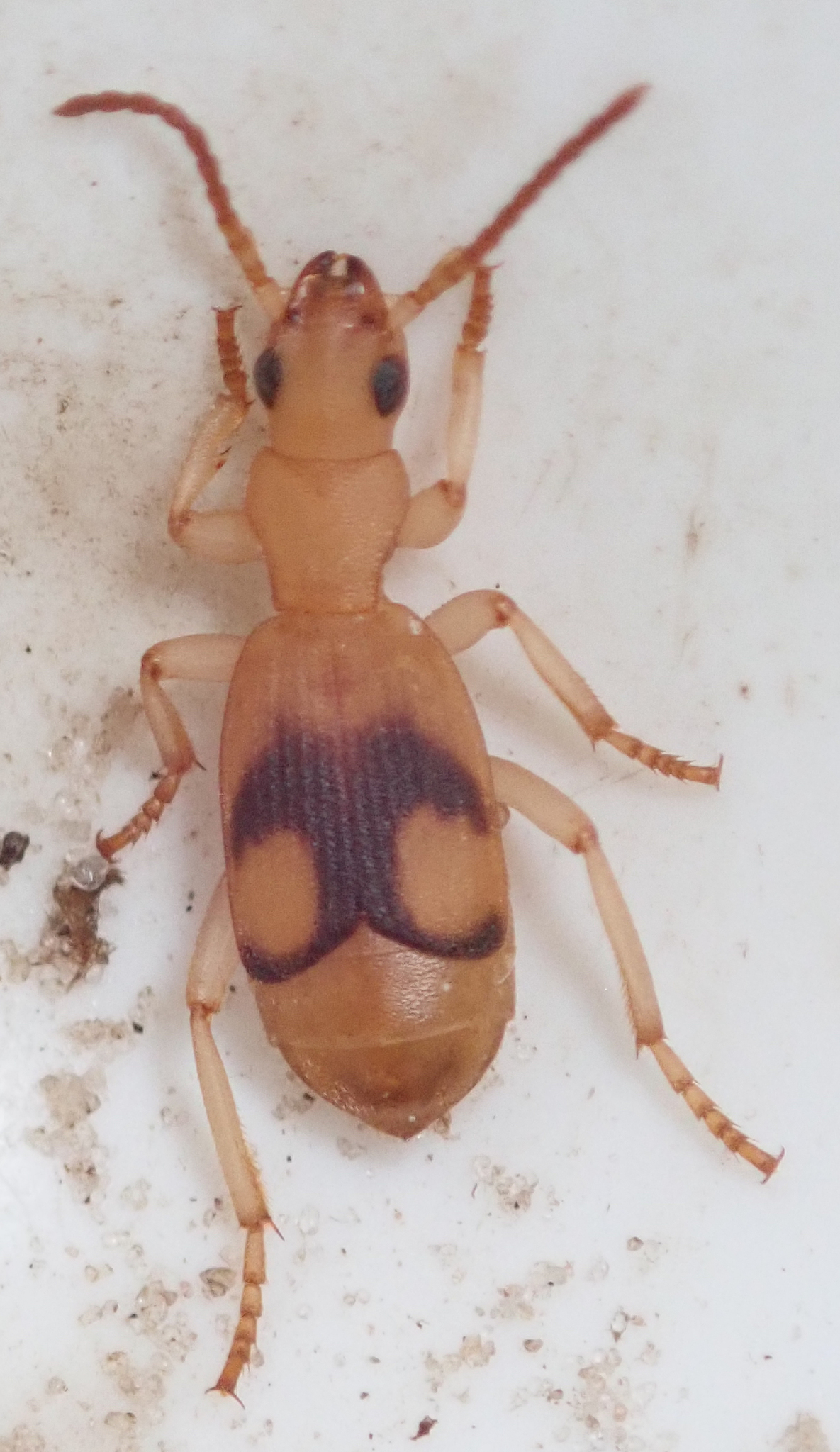
- Crepidogaster reducta, Botswana

Scientific classification
- Kingdom: Animalia
- Phylum: Arthropoda
- Class: Insecta
- Order: Coleoptera
- Suborder: Adephaga
- Family: Carabidae
- Subfamily: Brachininae
- Tribe: Crepidogastrini
- Genus: Crepidogaster; Boheman, 1848

Subgenera
- Crepidogaster Boheman, 1848; Tyronia Liebke, 1934

= Crepidogaster =

Genus of beetles

Crepidogaster is a genus in the beetle family Carabidae. There are more than 110 described species in Crepidogaster, found primarily in Africa and India.

== Species ==
These 111 species belong to the genus Crepidogaster:

- Crepidogaster aethiopica Basilewsky, 1988 (Ethiopia)
- Crepidogaster algoa (Basilewsky, 1959) (South Africa)
- Crepidogaster alticola (Basilewsky, 1988) (Democratic Republic of the Congo)
- Crepidogaster ambreana Deuve & Mateu, 1987 (Madagascar)
- Crepidogaster amieti Deuve, 2005
- Crepidogaster angolana Basilewsky, 1959 (Angola)
- Crepidogaster arnoldi (Basilewsky, 1959) (Zimbabwe)
- Crepidogaster atrata Péringuey, 1898 (South Africa)
- Crepidogaster aurasia Basilewsky, 1959 (South Africa)
- Crepidogaster bambusicola (Basilewsky, 1988) (Democratic Republic of the Congo)
- Crepidogaster basilewskyi Deuve & Mateu, 1987 (Madagascar)
- Crepidogaster bimaculata Boheman, 1848 (Africa)
- Crepidogaster bioculata Chaudoir, 1878 (Kenya and Tanzania)
- Crepidogaster brincki Basilewsky, 1959 (South Africa)
- Crepidogaster caeca (Basilewsky, 1959) (Tanzania)
- Crepidogaster caffra Péringuey, 1896 (South Africa)
- Crepidogaster celsa (Basilewsky, 1988) (Democratic Republic of the Congo)
- Crepidogaster ceylanica Deuve, 2012 (Sri Lanka)
- Crepidogaster cicatricosa Liebke, 1934 (South Africa)
- Crepidogaster confusa (Basilewsky, 1959) (South Africa)
- Crepidogaster costata (Dejean, 1831) (South Africa)
- Crepidogaster damarensis Péringuey, 1896 (Namibia)
- Crepidogaster decolorata Basilewsky, 1959 (South Africa)
- Crepidogaster delineata (Basilewsky, 1959) (Democratic Republic of the Congo)
- Crepidogaster deuvei (Basilewsky, 1988) (Democratic Republic of the Congo and Rwanda)
- Crepidogaster didyma Basilewsky, 1959 (Angola)
- Crepidogaster diluta Basilewsky, 1959 (Namibia)
- Crepidogaster dirrupta (Basilewsky, 1988) (South Africa)
- Crepidogaster dissimilis Basilewsky, 1959 (Angola and Namibia)
- Crepidogaster dolini Deuve, 2005
- Crepidogaster dollmani Liebke, 1934 (Zambia)
- Crepidogaster elegantula Basilewsky, 1988 (South Africa)
- Crepidogaster elongata Brancsik, 1893 (Madagascar)
- Crepidogaster endroedyi Basilewsky, 1988 (South Africa)
- Crepidogaster ferruginea Basilewsky, 1988 (South Africa)
- Crepidogaster fortesculpta (Basilewsky, 1959) (Democratic Republic of the Congo)
- Crepidogaster franzi Deuve & Mateu, 1987 (Madagascar)
- Crepidogaster funerula (Basilewsky, 1992) (South Africa)
- Crepidogaster garambae (Basilewsky, 1959) (Democratic Republic of the Congo)
- Crepidogaster grossa Liebke, 1934 (Namibia)
- Crepidogaster hessei Basilewsky, 1959 (South Africa)
- Crepidogaster holtzi Liebke, 1934 (Tanzania)
- Crepidogaster horni Dupuis, 1914 (Sri Lanka)
- Crepidogaster humerata Chaudoir, 1876 (India)
- Crepidogaster humicola (Basilewsky, 1959) (Democratic Republic of the Congo)
- Crepidogaster indica Deuve, 2012 (India)
- Crepidogaster infuscata (Dejean, 1825) (Africa)
- Crepidogaster insignis Péringuey, 1896 (Africa)
- Crepidogaster insularis Deuve & Mateu, 1987 (Madagascar)
- Crepidogaster iturica (Basilewsky, 1959) (Democratic Republic of the Congo)
- Crepidogaster jocquei (Basilewsky, 1988) (Malawi)
- Crepidogaster kaboboensis (Basilewsky, 1988) (Democratic Republic of the Congo)
- Crepidogaster kahuziana (Basilewsky, 1988) (Democratic Republic of the Congo)
- Crepidogaster kavanaughi Deuve, 2005
- Crepidogaster kivuensis Basilewsky, 1949 (Democratic Republic of the Congo, Rwanda, Burundi)
- Crepidogaster kochi Basilewsky, 1959 (Namibia)
- Crepidogaster kundelunguana (Basilewsky, 1959) (Democratic Republic of the Congo)
- Crepidogaster langenhani (Liebke, 1927) (Tanzania)
- Crepidogaster lateralis Basilewsky, 1949 (Africa)
- Crepidogaster laticollis (Basilewsky, 1959) (Democratic Republic of the Congo)
- Crepidogaster leleupi Basilewsky, 1953 (Democratic Republic of the Congo)
- Crepidogaster longelineata (Basilewsky, 1988) (Malawi)
- Crepidogaster louwerensi Basilewsky, 1959 (Kenya and Tanzania)
- Crepidogaster luberoensis (Basilewsky, 1988) (Democratic Republic of the Congo)
- Crepidogaster madecassa (Fairmaire, 1901) (Madagascar)
- Crepidogaster malawica (Basilewsky, 1988) (Malawi)
- Crepidogaster marginicollis Barker, 1919 (Zambia)
- Crepidogaster mateui Deuve, 2005
- Crepidogaster matonga Barker, 1919 (South Africa)
- Crepidogaster methneri Liebke, 1934 (Tanzania)
- Crepidogaster monticola (Basilewsky, 1988) (Democratic Republic of the Congo)
- Crepidogaster muhavurae (Basilewsky, 1988) (Rwanda)
- Crepidogaster mysorensis Deuve & Wrase, 2014 (India)
- Crepidogaster namaqua Basilewsky, 1988 (South Africa)
- Crepidogaster natalensis Péringuey, 1896 (South Africa)
- Crepidogaster natalica Péringuey, 1896 (South Africa)
- Crepidogaster neglecta Basilewsky, 1959 (Zambia, Zimbabwe, South Africa)
- Crepidogaster nonstriata Chaudoir, 1876 (South Africa)
- Crepidogaster notulatipennis Péringuey, 1896 (South Africa)
- Crepidogaster nyakagerana (Basilewsky, 1988) (Democratic Republic of the Congo)
- Crepidogaster oblata Basilewsky, 1988 (South Africa)
- Crepidogaster occidentalis (Basilewsky, 1968) (Sierra Leone and Ivory Coast)
- Crepidogaster oldeanica (Basilewsky, 1959) (Tanzania)
- Crepidogaster orophila (Basilewsky, 1988) (Democratic Republic of the Congo)
- Crepidogaster ovicollis Chaudoir, 1876 (South Africa)
- Crepidogaster pauliani Basilewsky, 1953 (Madagascar)
- Crepidogaster penrithae Basilewsky, 1988 (South Africa)
- Crepidogaster peyrierasi Deuve & Mateu, 1987 (Madagascar)
- Crepidogaster phallica (Basilewsky, 1988) (Democratic Republic of the Congo)
- Crepidogaster picipennis Chaudoir, 1876 (Angola and South Africa)
- Crepidogaster plagata Basilewsky, 1988 (South Africa)
- Crepidogaster portentosa Péringuey, 1898 (Mozambique and Zimbabwe)
- Crepidogaster posticalis Péringuey, 1896 (Angola, Namibia, South Africa)
- Crepidogaster protuberata Basilewsky, 1959 (Mozambique and South Africa)
- Crepidogaster pseudohumerata Deuve, 2015 (India)
- Crepidogaster reducta Basilewsky, 1959 (Angola, Zimbabwe, Botswana, Namibia)
- Crepidogaster rogueti Deuve, 2015 (India)
- Crepidogaster ruandana (Basilewsky, 1988) (Rwanda)
- Crepidogaster rufescens (Motschulsky, 1862) (South Africa)
- Crepidogaster ruwenzorica (Basilewsky, 1988) (Democratic Republic of the Congo)
- Crepidogaster sambesiaca Liebke, 1934 (Zimbabwe)
- Crepidogaster sansibarica Liebke, 1934 (Tanzania)
- Crepidogaster schroederi Liebke, 1934 (South Africa)
- Crepidogaster somalica Basilewsky, 1988 (Somalia)
- Crepidogaster specicola (Basilewsky, 1988) (Democratic Republic of the Congo)
- Crepidogaster straneoi Basilewsky, 1959 (Somalia)
- Crepidogaster subovicollis (Basilewsky, 1988) (South Africa)
- Crepidogaster swazica (Basilewsky, 1988) (South Africa)
- Crepidogaster tendiculata Basilewsky, 1988 (South Africa)
- Crepidogaster transvaalensis (Basilewsky, 1992) (South Africa)
- Crepidogaster venusta (Basilewsky, 1988) (South Africa)
