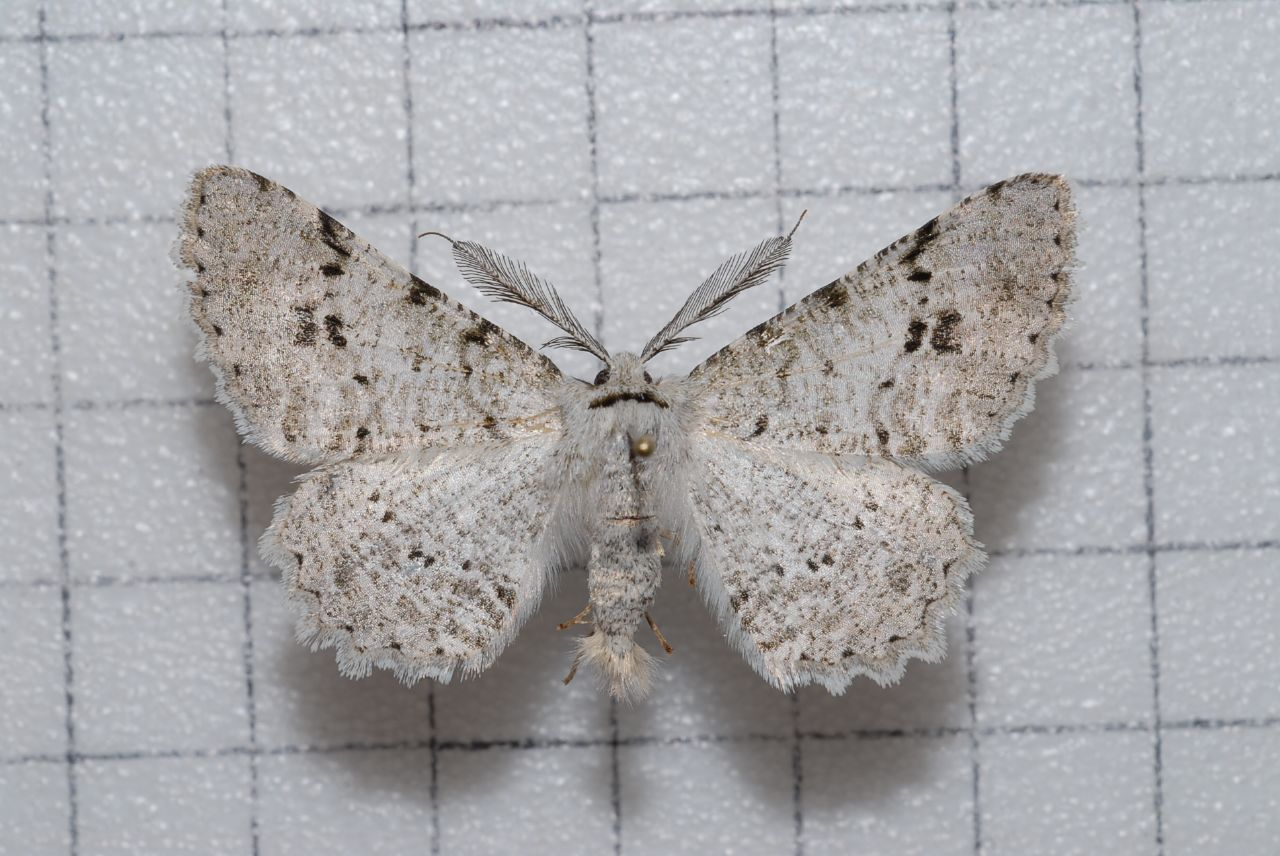
- Male
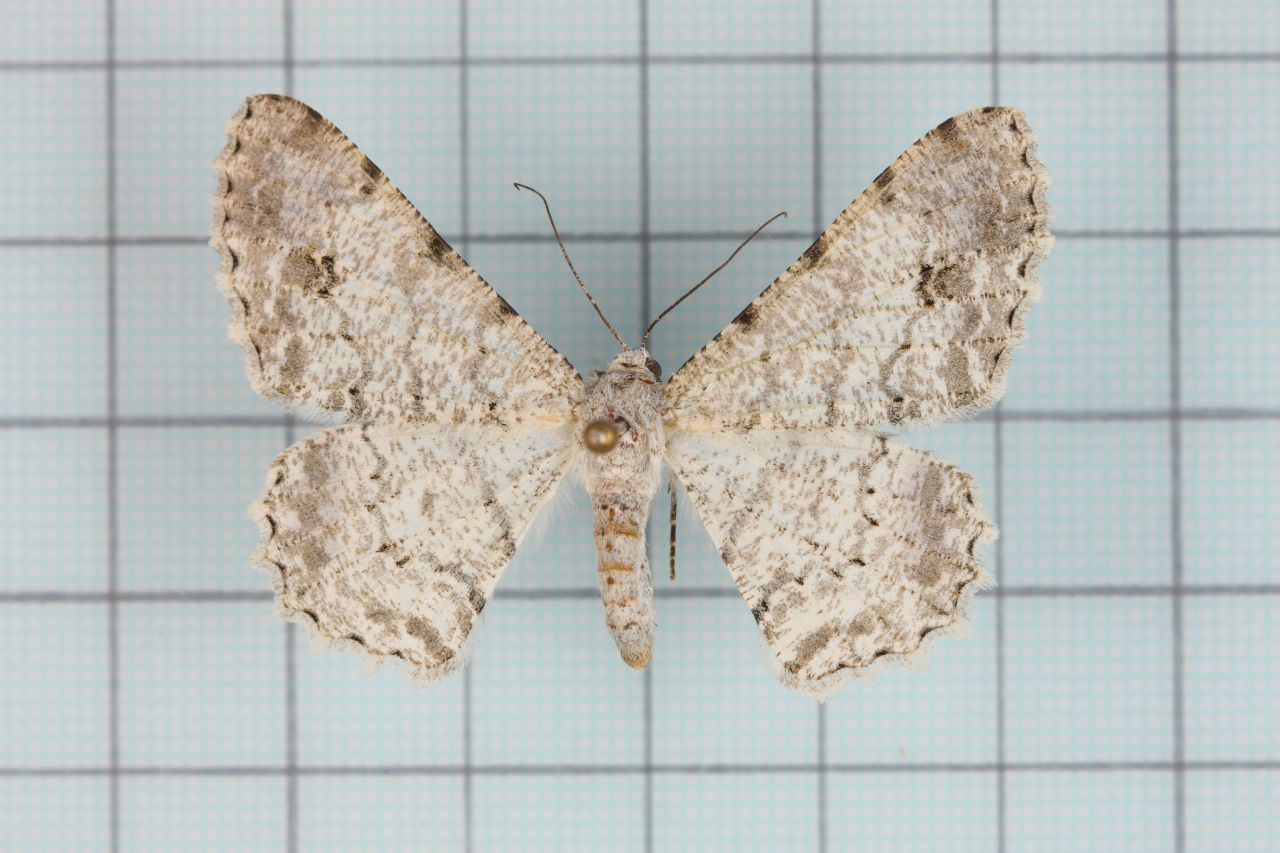
- Female

Scientific classification
- Kingdom: Animalia
- Phylum: Arthropoda
- Class: Insecta
- Order: Lepidoptera
- Family: Geometridae
- Genus: Lassaba
- Species: L. brevipennis

Binomial name
- Lassaba brevipennis (Inoue, 1978)

Synonyms
- Medasina brevipennis Inoue, 1978; Chorodna brevipennis

= Lassaba brevipennis =

Species of moth

Lassaba brevipennis is a moth in the family Geometridae. It is found in Taiwan.
