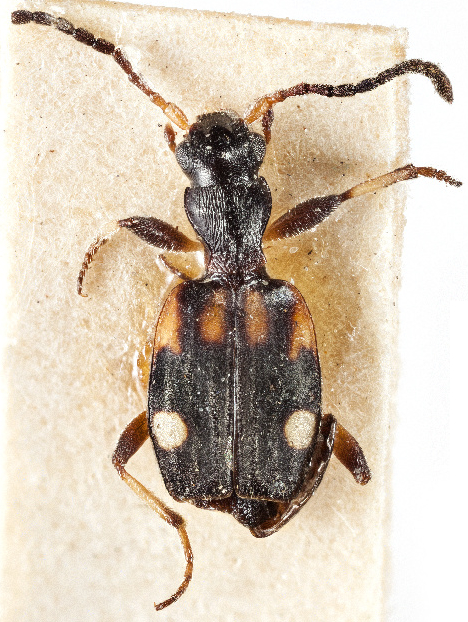

Scientific classification
- Kingdom: Animalia
- Phylum: Arthropoda
- Clade: Pancrustacea
- Class: Insecta
- Order: Coleoptera
- Suborder: Adephaga
- Family: Carabidae
- Genus: Mastax
- Species: M. brittoni

Binomial name
- Mastax brittoni Quentin, 1952

= Mastax brittoni =

Species of beetle

Mastax brittoni is a species of beetle in the family Carabidae that can be found in Taiwan.
