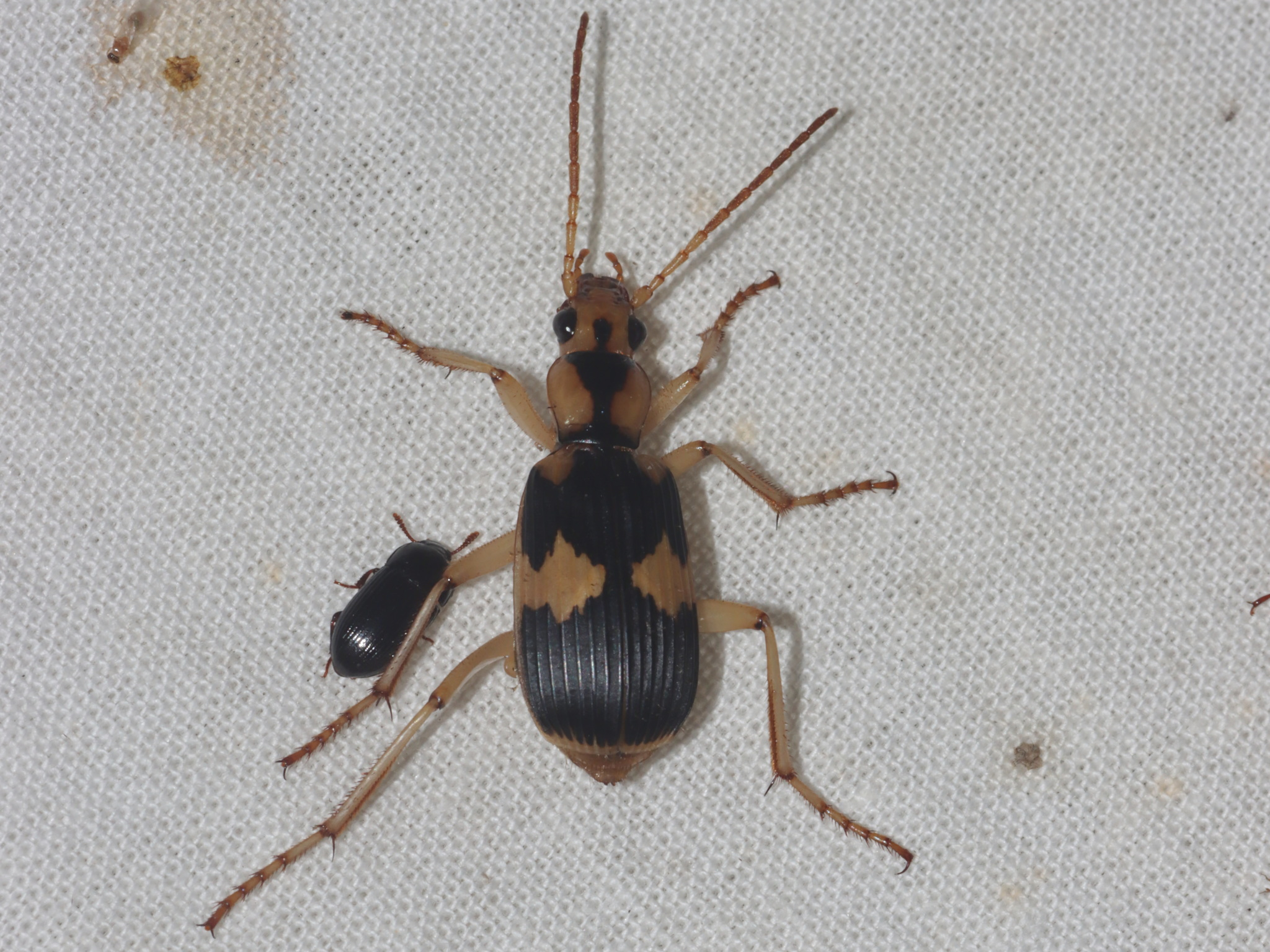
- Pheropsophus siamensis, Thailand

Scientific classification
- Kingdom: Animalia
- Phylum: Arthropoda
- Clade: Pancrustacea
- Class: Insecta
- Order: Coleoptera
- Suborder: Adephaga
- Family: Carabidae
- Subfamily: Brachininae
- Tribe: Brachinini
- Genus: Pheropsophus; Solier, 1833

Subgenera
- Aptinomorphus Jeannel, 1949; Pheropsophus Solier, 1833; Stenaptinus Maindron, 1906

Diversity
- at least 160 species

= Pheropsophus =

Genus of beetles

Pheropsophus is a genus of ground beetles in the family Carabidae. It is considered a sister group of the genus Pheropsophidius within the subtribe Pheropsophina.

== Species ==
These 163 species are members of the genus Pheropsophus

- Pheropsophus abbreviatus Arrow, 1901 (sub-Saharan Africa)
- Pheropsophus abyssinicus Alluaud, 1916 (Ethiopia)
- Pheropsophus acutecostatus Fairmaire, 1892 (Madagascar)
- Pheropsophus adrianae Giachino, 2005 (Indonesia and New Guinea)
- Pheropsophus aequinoctialis (Linnaeus, 1763) (= P.melanopterus, Mexico, Central, and South America)
- Pheropsophus africanus (Dejean, 1825) (North Africa and Southwest Asia)
- Pheropsophus agnatus Chaudoir, 1876 (Asia)
- Pheropsophus akhaensis Kirschenhofer, 2010 (Thailand)
- Pheropsophus alexandrae Giachino, 2003 (Australia)
- Pheropsophus amnicola Darlington, 1968 (New Guinea)
- Pheropsophus andrewesi Jedlicka, 1964 (India)
- Pheropsophus androyanus Alluaud, 1932
- Pheropsophus angolensis (Erichson, 1843) (Sub-Saharan Africa)
- Pheropsophus aptinoides Chaudoir, 1876 (India)
- Pheropsophus aptinomorphus Heller, 1910 (Indonesia and New Guinea)
- Pheropsophus arabicus Arrow, 1901 (Middle East)
- Pheropsophus arcanus (Erichson, 1843) (Sub-Saharan Africa)
- Pheropsophus assimilis Chaudoir, 1876 (East and Southeast Asia)
- Pheropsophus azoulayi Lassalle & Schnell, 2018 (Philippines)
- Pheropsophus baehri Giachino, 2005 (Indonesia and New Guinea)
- Pheropsophus baliothorax Heller, 1910 (Indonesia and New Guinea)
- Pheropsophus balkei Giachino, 2005 (Indonesia and New Guinea)
- Pheropsophus basiguttatus Chaudoir, 1876 (Sub-Saharan Africa)
- Pheropsophus beauvoisi (Dejean, 1825)
- Pheropsophus beckeri Jedlicka, 1930 (China and temperate Asia)
- Pheropsophus bequaerti Burgeon, 1937 (Sub-Saharan Africa)
- Pheropsophus bidoupensis Fedorenko, 2013 (Vietnam)
- Pheropsophus bimaculatus (Linnaeus, 1771) (South Asia)
- Pheropsophus bipartitus Fairmaire, 1869 (Madagascar)
- Pheropsophus biplagiatus Chaudoir, 1876 (Mexico)
- Pheropsophus bisulcatus Chaudoir, 1843 (Africa)
- Pheropsophus bohemani Chaudoir, 1876 (Africa)
- Pheropsophus borkuanus Bruneau de Miré, 1990 (Chad)
- Pheropsophus brussinoi Giachino, 2005 (Indonesia and New Guinea)
- Pheropsophus canis Darlington, 1968 (New Guinea)
- Pheropsophus capensis Chaudoir, 1876 (Sub-Saharan Africa)
- Pheropsophus capitatus Jedlicka, 1935 (Philippines)
- Pheropsophus cardoni Maindron, 1898 (India)
- Pheropsophus catoirei (Dejean, 1825) (Southern Asia)
- Pheropsophus catulus Darlington, 1968 (New Guinea)
- Pheropsophus chaudoiri Arrow, 1901 (Indomalaya)
- Pheropsophus cincticollis (LaFerté-Sénectère, 1850) (Sub-Saharan Africa)
- Pheropsophus cinctus (Gory, 1833) (Africa and the Middle-East)
- Pheropsophus claudiae Giachino, 2005 (New Guinea)
- Pheropsophus congoensis Arrow, 1901 (Sub-Saharan Africa)
- Pheropsophus consularis (Schmidt-Goebel, 1846) (Indomalaya)
- Pheropsophus darwini Giachino, 2003 (Australia)
- Pheropsophus debauvii (Guérin-Méneville, 1838) (South America)
- Pheropsophus delmastroi Giachino, 2005 (Indonesia and New Guinea)
- Pheropsophus devagiriensis Venugopal & Sabu, 2019 (India)
- Pheropsophus dilatatus Burgeon, 1936 (Ghana)
- Pheropsophus dimidiatus Arrow, 1901 (Sub-Saharan Africa)
- Pheropsophus dissolutus Andrewes, 1923 (Asia)
- Pheropsophus dongnaiensis (Fedorenko, 2021) (Vietnam)
- Pheropsophus dregei Chaudoir, 1876 (Sub-Saharan Africa)
- Pheropsophus dux Chaudoir, 1876 (Ethiopia)
- Pheropsophus ecuadorensis Hubenthal, 1911 (Ecuador)
- Pheropsophus emarginatus Chaudoir, 1876 (Asia, Philippines)
- Pheropsophus erjanii Hrdlicka, 2017 (Indonesia)
- Pheropsophus exiguus Arrow, 1901 (the Democratic Republic of the Congo)
- Pheropsophus fastigiatus (Linnaeus, 1764) (Sub-Saharan Africa)
- Pheropsophus fimbriatus Chaudoir, 1876 (Indomalaya)
- Pheropsophus fulminans (Fabricius, 1801)
- Pheropsophus fumigatus (Dejean, 1825) (Philippines)
- Pheropsophus galloi Giachino, 2005 (Indonesia and New Guinea)
- Pheropsophus gironieri Eydoux & Souleyet, 1839 (Indonesia and Philippines)
- Pheropsophus glabricollis (Fedorenko, 2020) (Vietnam)
- Pheropsophus globulicollis Hubenthal, 1918
- Pheropsophus gracilis Arrow, 1901
- Pheropsophus gregoryi Giachino, 2003 (Australia)
- Pheropsophus guanxiensis Kirschenhofer, 2010 (China and Vietnam)
- Pheropsophus guineensis Chaudoir, 1876
- Pheropsophus halteri (Chaudoir, 1837)
- Pheropsophus hassenteufeli Straneo, 1960 (Philippines)
- Pheropsophus heathi Arrow, 1901 (Myanmar)
- Pheropsophus hilaris (Fabricius, 1798) (Southern Asia)
- Pheropsophus hispanicus (Dejean, 1824) (North Africa and the Mediterranean)
- Pheropsophus humeralis Chaudoir, 1843 (the Comoro Islands, Madagascar, and Seychelles)
- Pheropsophus impressicollis LaFerté-Sénectère, 1850
- Pheropsophus indicus Venugopal & Sabu, 2019 (India)
- Pheropsophus infantulus Bates, 1892 (Myanmar, Thailand, and Vietnam)
- Pheropsophus iranicus Reitter, 1919 (Iran)
- Pheropsophus jakli Hrdlicka, 2015 (Indonesia)
- Pheropsophus jandai Hrdlicka, 2019 (New Guinea and Papua)
- Pheropsophus javanus (Dejean, 1825) (Palearctic)
- Pheropsophus jessoensis A.Morawitz, 1862 (Eastern Asia)
- Pheropsophus jurinei (Dejean, 1825) (Africa)
- Pheropsophus kabelkai Hrdlicka, 2015 (Indonesia)
- Pheropsophus katangensis Burgeon, 1937 (the Democratic Republic of the Congo)
- Pheropsophus kersteni Gerstaecker, 1867 (Africa)
- Pheropsophus kolbei Hubenthal, 1914
- Pheropsophus krichna (Maindron, 1906) (India)
- Pheropsophus lafertei Arrow, 1901
- Pheropsophus langenhani Hubenthal, 1911 (Brazil)
- Pheropsophus laticostis Chaudoir, 1876
- Pheropsophus lineifrons Chaudoir, 1850 (India and Pakistan)
- Pheropsophus lissoderus Chaudoir, 1850 (Indomalaya)
- Pheropsophus livingstoni Arrow, 1901 (Sub-Saharan Africa)
- Pheropsophus longipennis Chaudoir, 1843
- Pheropsophus lumawigi Hrdlicka, 2019 (Philippines)
- Pheropsophus maculicollis Hubenthal, 1914 (the Democratic Republic of the Congo)
- Pheropsophus madagascariensis (Dejean, 1831) (Madagascar)
- Pheropsophus malaisei Landin, 1955 (Myanmar)
- Pheropsophus marginatus (Dejean, 1825) (Africa)
- Pheropsophus marginicollis Motschulsky, 1854 (China)
- Pheropsophus marginipennis (Laporte, 1835)
- Pheropsophus mashunus Péringuey, 1896 (Sub-Saharan Africa)
- Pheropsophus minahassae Heller, 1903 (Indonesia)
- Pheropsophus minor Murray, 1857 (Sub-Saharan Africa)
- Pheropsophus montanus (Fedorenko, 2020) (Vietnam)
- Pheropsophus nanodes Bates, 1892 (China and India)
- Pheropsophus nebulosus Chaudoir, 1876 (Asia)
- Pheropsophus nepalensis Kirschenhofer, 2010 (Nepal)
- Pheropsophus ngoclinhensis Fedorenko, 2013 (Vietnam)
- Pheropsophus nigerrimus Jedlicka, 1935 (Philippines)
- Pheropsophus nigricollis Arrow, 1901 (India)
- Pheropsophus nigriventris Chaudoir, 1878 (Africa)
- Pheropsophus nyasae Arrow, 1901
- Pheropsophus obiensis Hrdlicka, 2014 (Indonesia)
- Pheropsophus obliquatus (J.Thomson, 1858)
- Pheropsophus obliteratus Fedorenko, 2013 (Vietnam)
- Pheropsophus occipitalis (W.S.MacLeay, 1825) (Asia)
- Pheropsophus pallidepunctatus Arrow, 1901
- Pheropsophus palmarum Chaudoir, 1876 (Ivory Coast)
- Pheropsophus parallelus (Dejean, 1825) (Africa)
- Pheropsophus pauliani Colas, 1944 (Cameroon)
- Pheropsophus pedes Darlington, 1968 (Indonesia and New Guinea)
- Pheropsophus perroti Arrow, 1901 (Madagascar)
- Pheropsophus planti Chaudoir, 1876 (Mozambique and South Africa)
- Pheropsophus platycephalus Reichardt, 1967 (Mexico)
- Pheropsophus prophylax Heller, 1903 (India)
- Pheropsophus raffrayi Chaudoir, 1878 (Africa)
- Pheropsophus recticollis Arrow, 1901 (the Democratic Republic of the Congo)
- Pheropsophus reductus Colas, 1944
- Pheropsophus riedeli Giachino, 2005 (Indonesia and New Guinea)
- Pheropsophus rivierii (De Mey, 1838) (South America)
- Pheropsophus rolex Morvan, 1995 (Nepal)
- Pheropsophus rufimembris Fairmaire, 1901
- Pheropsophus sangirensis Hrdlicka, 2017 (Indonesia)
- Pheropsophus scythropus Andrewes, 1923 (South Asia)
- Pheropsophus senegalensis (Dejean, 1825) (Africa)
- Pheropsophus siamensis Chaudoir, 1876 (Southeast Asia)
- Pheropsophus similis Fedorenko, 2013 (Vietnam)
- Pheropsophus sobrinus (Dejean, 1826) (South Asia)
- Pheropsophus sonae Hrdlicka, 2015 (Nigeria)
- Pheropsophus stenoderus Chaudoir, 1850 (Indomalaya)
- Pheropsophus stenopterus Chaudoir, 1878
- Pheropsophus straneoi Giachino, 2003 (Australia)
- Pheropsophus sumatrensis (Fedorenko, 2021) (Indonesia)
- Pheropsophus taclobanensis Lassalle & Schnell, 2019 (Philippines)
- Pheropsophus talaudensis Hrdlicka, 2014 (Indonesia)
- Pheropsophus tamdaoensis Kirschenhofer, 2010 (Vietnam)
- Pheropsophus transvaalensis Péringuey, 1896 (South Africa and Zimbabwe)
- Pheropsophus tripustulatus (Fabricius, 1792) (India and Thailand)
- Pheropsophus tristis Arrow, 1901 (Africa)
- Pheropsophus ubomboensis Barker, 1919 (South Africa)
- Pheropsophus uelensis Burgeon, 1937 (the Democratic Republic of the Congo)
- Pheropsophus uniformis Hubenthal, 1914 (Africa)
- Pheropsophus verticalis (Dejean, 1825) (Australia, Oceania)
- Pheropsophus windjanae Baehr, 2012 (Australia)
- Pheropsophus wolfi Giachino, 2005 (Indonesia and New Guinea)
- Pheropsophus worthingtoni
- Pheropsophus yunnanensis Kirschenhofer, 2010 (China)
