= Mastax formosana =

Scientific classification
- Kingdom: Animalia
- Phylum: Arthropoda
- Clade: Pancrustacea
- Class: Insecta
- Order: Coleoptera
- Suborder: Adephaga
- Family: Carabidae
- Genus: Mastax
- Species: M. formosana

Binomial name
- Mastax formosana Dupuis, 1912

Species of beetle

Mastax formosana is a species of beetle in the family Carabidae with a restricted distribution in Taiwan.
