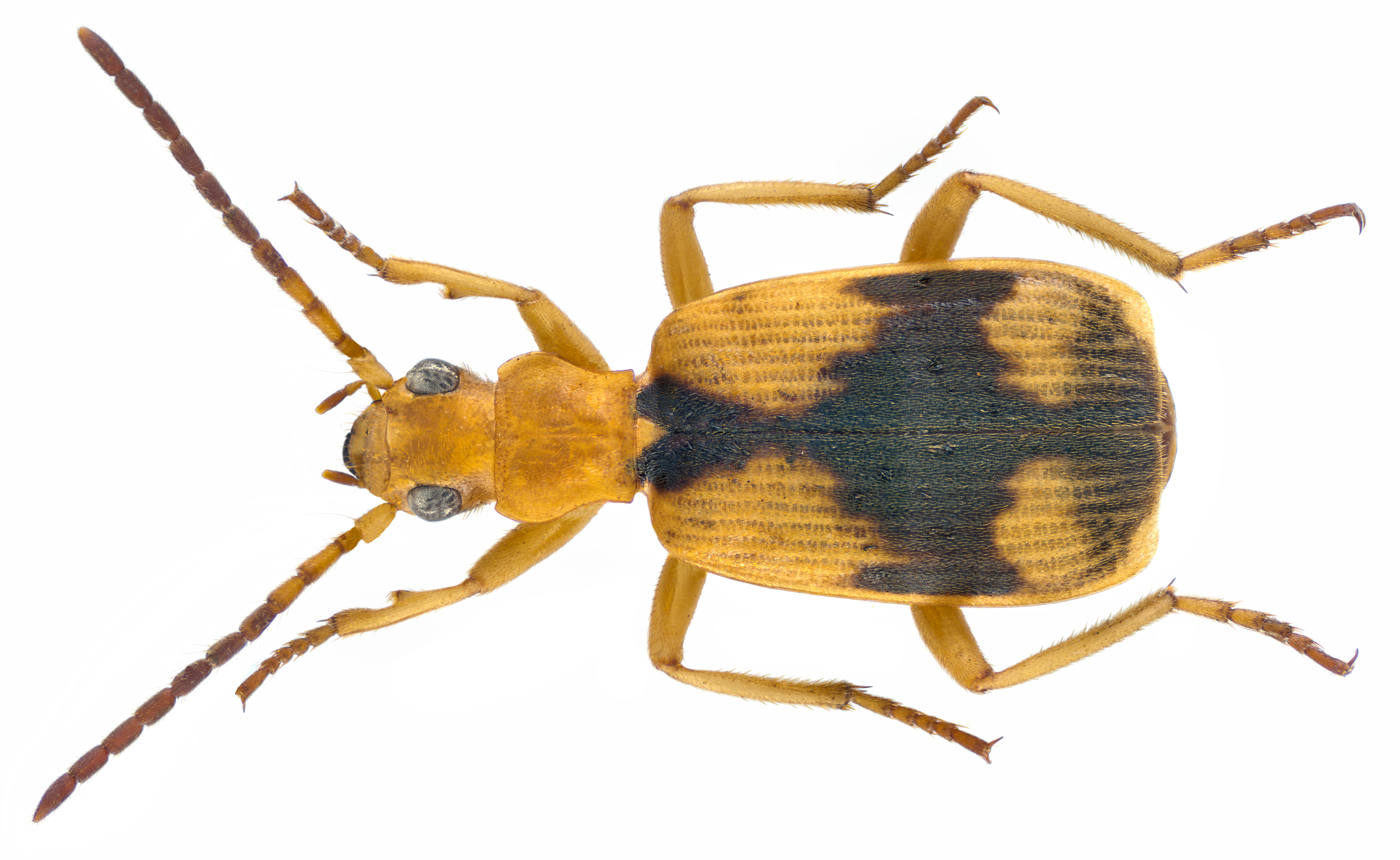
- Styphlomerus equestris

Scientific classification
- Domain: Eukaryota
- Kingdom: Animalia
- Phylum: Arthropoda
- Class: Insecta
- Order: Coleoptera
- Suborder: Adephaga
- Family: Carabidae
- Subfamily: Brachininae
- Tribe: Brachinini
- Genus: Styphlomerus; Chaudoir in Putzeys, 1875

Subgenera
- Styphlomerinus Jeannel, 1949; Styphlomerus Chaudoir in Putzeys, 1875

= Styphlomerus =

Genus of beetles

Styphlomerus is a genus in the beetle family Carabidae. There are more than 40 described species in Styphlomerus, found in Africa and Asia.

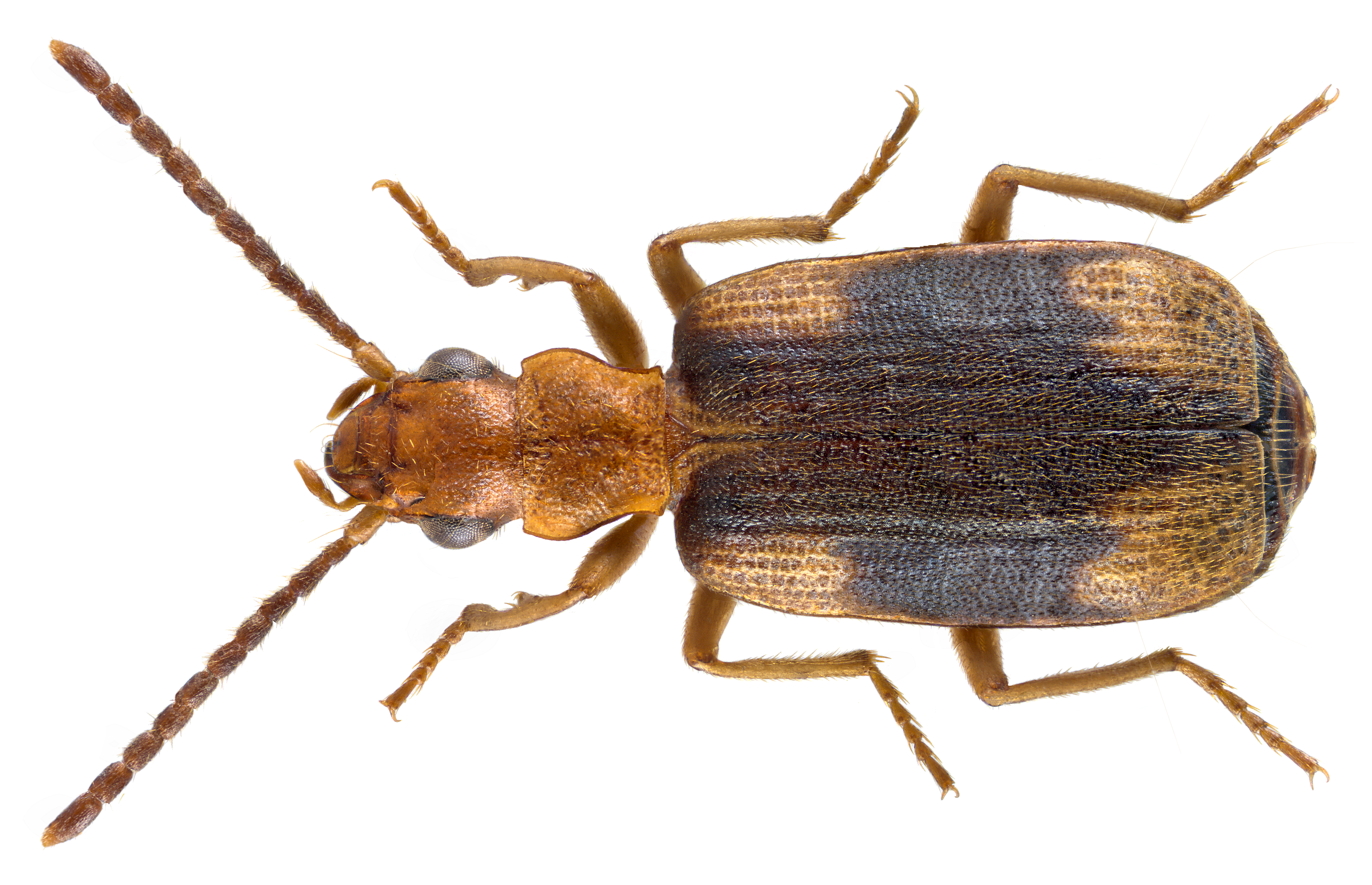
Styphlomerus placidus

== Species ==
These 49 species belong to the genus Styphlomerus:

- Styphlomerus amplus Liebke, 1934 (Sierra Leone)
- Styphlomerus aulicus (Dejean, 1831) (Senegal/Gambia and Burkina Faso)
- Styphlomerus batesi Chaudoir, 1876 (Japan)
- Styphlomerus bimaculatus Hrdlicka, 2017 (India)
- Styphlomerus burgeoni Liebke, 1934 (Africa)
- Styphlomerus ciliatus Liebke, 1934 (Ivory Coast and Cameroon)
- Styphlomerus comoricus (Fairmaire, 1896) (the Comoro Islands)
- Styphlomerus cribricollis Chaudoir, 1876 (Senegal/Gambia)
- Styphlomerus devagiriensis Venugopal & Sabu, 2019 (India)
- Styphlomerus equestris (Dejean, 1831) (Africa)
- Styphlomerus exilis (LaFerté-Sénectère, 1850) (Africa)
- Styphlomerus fallax (Péringuey, 1896) (South Africa)
- Styphlomerus flavus Liebke, 1934 (Kenya and Tanzania)
- Styphlomerus foveatus Liebke, 1934 (Democratic Republic of the Congo and Tanzania)
- Styphlomerus fusciceps (Schmidt-Goebel, 1846) (China, Taiwan, Indomalaya)
- Styphlomerus fuscicollis Landin, 1955 (Myanmar)
- Styphlomerus fuscifrons (Fairmaire, 1897) (Madagascar)
- Styphlomerus gebieni Liebke, 1927 (Africa)
- Styphlomerus impressifrons (Fairmaire, 1897) (Madagascar)
- Styphlomerus kamerunus Liebke, 1927 (Cameroon)
- Styphlomerus kisantuus Liebke, 1934 (Democratic Republic of the Congo)
- Styphlomerus kochi Basilewsky, 1959 (South Africa)
- Styphlomerus korgei (Jedlicka, 1964) (China)
- Styphlomerus lamottei Basilewsky, 1951 (Africa)
- Styphlomerus ludicrus (Erichson, 1843) (Africa)
- Styphlomerus methneri Liebke, 1934 (Tanzania)
- Styphlomerus montanus (Péringuey, 1896) (South Africa)
- Styphlomerus neavei Liebke, 1934 (Democratic Republic of the Congo and Malawi)
- Styphlomerus opacicollis (Brancsik, 1893) (Madagascar)
- Styphlomerus ovalipennis Liebke, 1934 (Africa)
- Styphlomerus paralleloides Lorenz, 1998 (Chad, Sudan, and Somalia)
- Styphlomerus piccolo Liebke, 1927 (Africa)
- Styphlomerus placidus (Péringuey, 1896) (Africa)
- Styphlomerus plausibilis Péringuey, 1904 (Zimbabwe)
- Styphlomerus postdilatatus Burgeon, 1947 (Kenya)
- Styphlomerus puberulus Péringuey, 1896 (South Africa)
- Styphlomerus quadrimaculatus (Dejean, 1831) (Africa)
- Styphlomerus renaudi Basilewsky, 1965 (Chad)
- Styphlomerus ruficeps Chaudoir, 1876 (India)
- Styphlomerus seyrigi (Jeannel, 1949) (Madagascar)
- Styphlomerus sinus Alluaud, 1918 (Madagascar)
- Styphlomerus speciosus Basilewsky, 1949 (Somalia)
- Styphlomerus sticticollis (Fairmaire, 1885) (Madagascar)
- Styphlomerus striatus Venugopal & Sabu, 2019 (India)
- Styphlomerus tellinii Maindron, 1905 (Eritrea and Tanzania)
- Styphlomerus timoriensis (Jordan, 1894) (Indonesia)
- Styphlomerus titschacki Liebke, 1927 (Cameroon)
- Styphlomerus undulatus (Chaudoir, 1843) (Senegal/Gambia)
- Styphlomerus vittaticollis (Péringuey, 1885) (Africa)
