= Styphlodromus =

Scientific classification
- Kingdom: Animalia
- Phylum: Arthropoda
- Class: Insecta
- Order: Coleoptera
- Suborder: Adephaga
- Family: Carabidae
- Tribe: Brachinini
- Genus: Styphlodromus; Basilewsky, 1959
- Species: S. bicolor

Binomial name
- Styphlodromus bicolor Basilewsky, 1959

Species of beetle

Styphlodromus is a genus in the ground beetle family Carabidae. This genus has a single species, Styphlodromus bicolor. It is found in Zimbabwe and Namibia.
