= Mastax klapperichi =

Scientific classification
- Kingdom: Animalia
- Phylum: Arthropoda
- Clade: Pancrustacea
- Class: Insecta
- Order: Coleoptera
- Suborder: Adephaga
- Family: Carabidae
- Genus: Mastax
- Species: M. klapperichi

Binomial name
- Mastax klapperichi Jedlička, 1956

Species of beetle

Mastax congoensis is a species of beetle in the family Carabidae with restricted distribution in the Afghanistan.
