= Mastax vegeta =

Scientific classification
- Domain: Eukaryota
- Kingdom: Animalia
- Phylum: Arthropoda
- Class: Insecta
- Order: Coleoptera
- Suborder: Adephaga
- Family: Carabidae
- Genus: Mastax
- Species: M. vegeta

Binomial name
- Mastax vegeta Andrewes, 1924

Species of beetle

Mastax vegeta is a species of beetle in the family Carabidae found in such Indian provinces as Darjeeling, Himachal Pradesh, Sikkim and Uttarakhand. In Uttarrakhand it was found north-northeast of Ramnagar in the valley near Kosi River. The species have brown pronotum and yellow dots on its black body.
