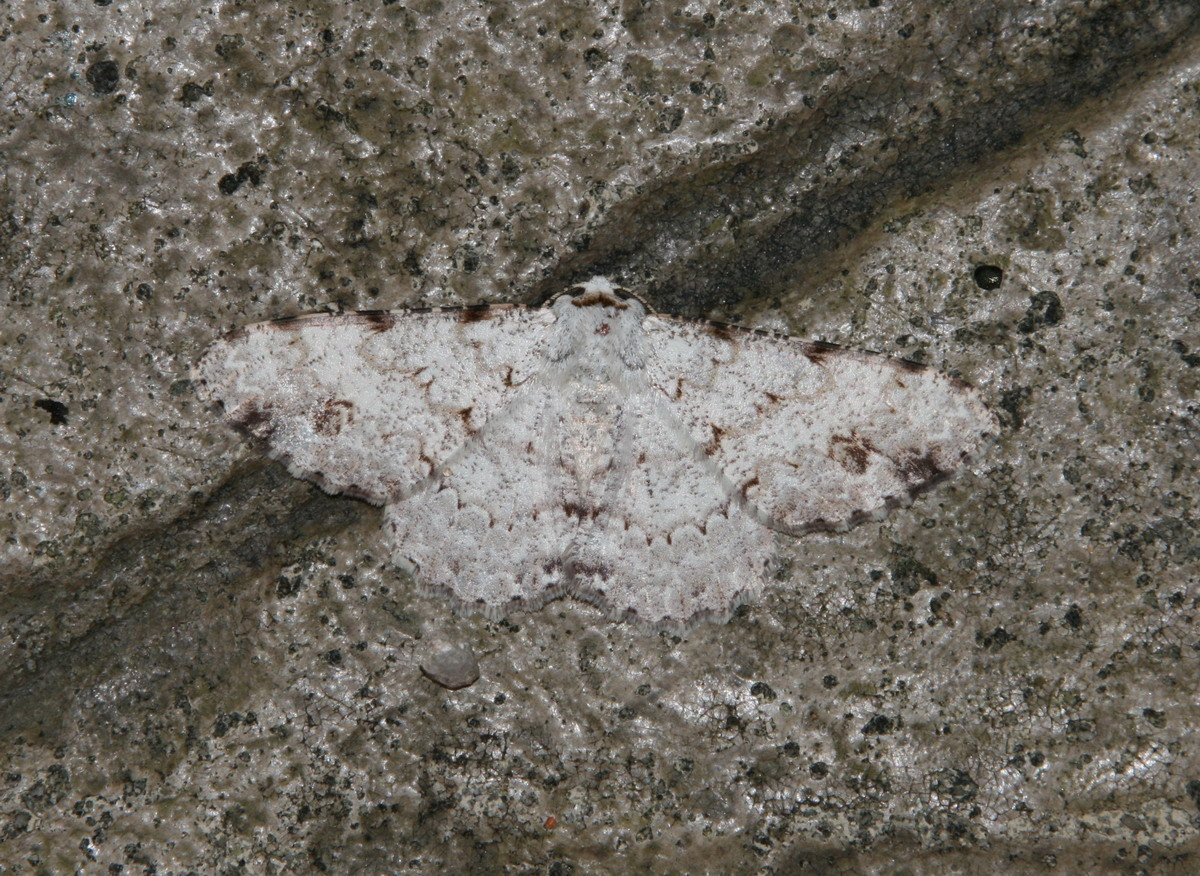

Scientific classification
- Kingdom: Animalia
- Phylum: Arthropoda
- Clade: Pancrustacea
- Class: Insecta
- Order: Lepidoptera
- Family: Geometridae
- Genus: Lassaba
- Species: L. acribomena

Binomial name
- Lassaba acribomena (Prout, 1928)

Synonyms
- Medasina acribomena Prout, 1928

= Lassaba acribomena =

Species of moth

Lassaba acribomena is a moth of the family Geometridae first described by Louis Beethoven Prout in 1928. It is found in Sumatra, Peninsular Malaysia, Borneo and possibly the Philippines.
