= Mastax carissima =

Scientific classification
- Kingdom: Animalia
- Phylum: Arthropoda
- Clade: Pancrustacea
- Class: Insecta
- Order: Coleoptera
- Suborder: Adephaga
- Family: Carabidae
- Genus: Mastax
- Species: M. carissima

Binomial name
- Mastax carissima Bates, 1892

Species of beetle

Mastax carissima is a species of beetle in the family Carabidae found in Myanmar.
