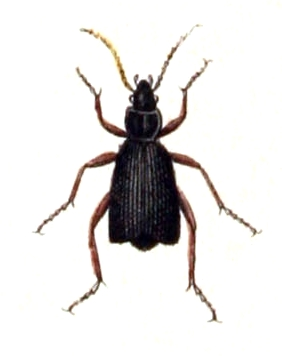
- Aptinus bombarda

Scientific classification
- Kingdom: Animalia
- Phylum: Arthropoda
- Class: Insecta
- Order: Coleoptera
- Suborder: Adephaga
- Family: Carabidae
- Subfamily: Brachininae
- Genus: Aptinus; Bonelli, 1810

= Aptinus =

Genus of beetles

Aptinus is a genus of ground beetle native to Europe and the Near East. It contains the following species:

- Aptinus acutangulus Chaudoir, 1876
- Aptinus alpinus Dejean, 1829
- Aptinus bombarda (Illiger, 1800)
- Aptinus cordicollis Chaudoir, 1843
- Aptinus creticus Pic, 1903
- Aptinus displosor L. Dufour, 1811
- Aptinus hovorkai Hrdlicka, 2005
- Aptinus lugubris Schaum, 1862
- Aptinus merditanus Apfelbeck, 1918
- Aptinus pyranaeus Dejean, 1824
