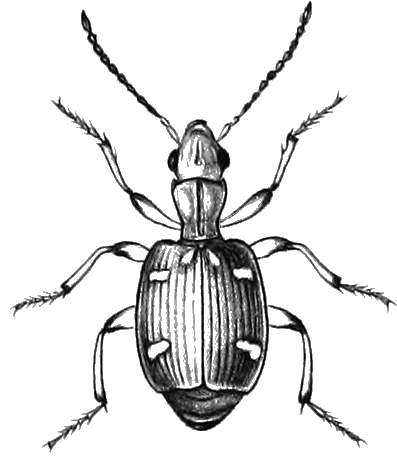
- Mastax ornatella

Scientific classification
- Kingdom: Animalia
- Phylum: Arthropoda
- Clade: Pancrustacea
- Class: Insecta
- Order: Coleoptera
- Suborder: Adephaga
- Family: Carabidae
- Subfamily: Brachininae
- Tribe: Brachinini
- Genus: Mastax; Fischer von Waldheim, 1828

= Mastax =

Genus of beetles in the family Carabidae

Mastax is a genus of beetles in the family Carabidae, containing the following 52 species:

- Mastax albonotata Peringuey, 1885
- Mastax alternans Basilewsky, 1959
- Mastax annulata Andrewes, 1924
- Mastax brittoni Quentin, 1952
- Mastax burgeoni Liebke, 1934
- Mastax carissima Bates, 1892
- Mastax confusa Basilewsky, 1959
- Mastax congoensis Basilewsky, 1987
- Mastax elegantula Schmidt-Gobel, 1846
- Mastax euanthes Andrewes, 1924
- Mastax extrema Peringuey, 1896
- Mastax florida Andrewes, 1924
- Mastax formosana Dupuis, 1912
- Mastax fortesculpta Basilewsky, 1988
- Mastax fulvonotata Quentin, 1952
- Mastax gestroi Bates, 1892
- Mastax hargreavesi Liebke, 1931
- Mastax histrio Fabricius, 1801
- Mastax humilis Andrewes, 1936
- Mastax kivuensis Basilewsky, 1959
- Mastax klapperichi Jedlicka, 1956
- Mastax kulti Basilewsky, 1949
- Mastax laeviceps Bates, 1891
- Mastax latefasciata Liebke, 1931
- Mastax liebkei Burgeon, 1937
- Mastax louwerensi Andrewes, 1936
- Mastax moesta Schmidt-Goebel, 1846
- Mastax nana Basilewsky, 1949
- Mastax nepalensis Morvan, 1977
- Mastax ochraceonotata Pic, 1912
- Mastax okavango Basilewsky, 1988
- Mastax ornata Schidt-Goebel, 1846
- Mastax ornatella Boheman, 1848
- Mastax pakistana Jedlicka, 1963
- Mastax parreyssi Chaudoir, 1850
- Mastax philippina Jedlicka, 1935
- Mastax poecila Schaum, 1863
- Mastax pulchella Dejean, 1831
- Mastax pygmaea Andrewes, 1930
- Mastax raffrayi Chaudoir, 1876
- Mastax rawalpindi Jedlicka, 1963
- Mastax royi Basilewsky, 1969
- Mastax rugiceps Bates, 1892
- Mastax saganicola G.Muller, 1942
- Mastax senegalensis Liebke, 1934
- Mastax striaticeps Chaudoir, 1876
- Mastax subornatella Basilewsky, 1958
- Mastax sudanica Basilewsky, 1959
- Mastax tessmanni Liebke, 1934
- Mastax thermarum Steven, 1806
- Mastax tratorius Basilewsky, 1962
- Mastax vegeta Andrewes, 1924
