= Brachynillus =

Scientific classification
- Kingdom: Animalia
- Phylum: Arthropoda
- Class: Insecta
- Order: Coleoptera
- Suborder: Adephaga
- Family: Carabidae
- Subfamily: Brachininae
- Genus: Brachynillus; Reitter, 1904

Genus of beetles

Brachynillus is a genus of beetles in the family Carabidae, containing the following species:

- Brachynillus natalensis Basilewsky, 1988
- Brachynillus pallidus (Peringuey, 1896)
- Brachynillus varendorffi Reitter, 1904
