= Crepidolomus =

Scientific classification
- Domain: Eukaryota
- Kingdom: Animalia
- Phylum: Arthropoda
- Class: Insecta
- Order: Coleoptera
- Suborder: Adephaga
- Family: Carabidae
- Subfamily: Brachininae
- Tribe: Crepidogastrini
- Genus: Crepidolomus; Basilewsky, 1959

Genus of beetles

Crepidolomus is a genus in the ground beetle family Carabidae. There are at least two described species in Crepidolomus, found in Madagascar.

== Species ==
These two species belong to the genus Crepidolomus:

- Crepidolomus descarpentriesi Mateu, 1986
- Crepidolomus extimus (Jeannel, 1955)
