= Mastax latefasciata =

Scientific classification
- Kingdom: Animalia
- Phylum: Arthropoda
- Clade: Pancrustacea
- Class: Insecta
- Order: Coleoptera
- Suborder: Adephaga
- Family: Carabidae
- Genus: Mastax
- Species: M. latefasciata

Binomial name
- Mastax latefasciata Liebke, 1931

Species of beetle

Mastax latefasciata is a species of beetle in the family Carabidae found in China and Vietnam.
