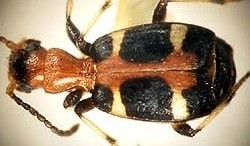

Scientific classification
- Kingdom: Animalia
- Phylum: Arthropoda
- Clade: Pancrustacea
- Class: Insecta
- Order: Coleoptera
- Suborder: Adephaga
- Family: Carabidae
- Genus: Mastax
- Species: M. histrio

Binomial name
- Mastax histrio (Fabricius, 1801)

= Mastax histrio =

Species of beetle

Mastax histrio is a species of beetle in the family Carabidae found in India, Pakistan and Sri Lanka.
