= Aptinoderus =

Scientific classification
- Kingdom: Animalia
- Phylum: Arthropoda
- Class: Insecta
- Order: Coleoptera
- Suborder: Adephaga
- Family: Carabidae
- Subfamily: Brachininae
- Genus: Aptinoderus; Hubenthal, 1919

Genus of beetles

Aptinoderus is a genus of beetles in the family Carabidae, containing the following species:

- Aptinoderus cyaneus (Motschulsky, 1864)
- Aptinoderus cyanipennis (Chaudoir, 1876)
- Aptinoderus funebris (Peringuey, 1899)
- Aptinoderus peringueyi (Csiki, 1933)
- Aptinoderus umvotianus (Peringuey, 1904)
