= Mastax albonotata =

Scientific classification
- Kingdom: Animalia
- Phylum: Arthropoda
- Clade: Pancrustacea
- Class: Insecta
- Order: Coleoptera
- Suborder: Adephaga
- Family: Carabidae
- Genus: Mastax
- Species: M. albonotata

Binomial name
- Mastax albonotata Péringuey, 1885

Species of beetle

Mastax albonotata is a species of beetle in the family Carabidae found in South Africa.
