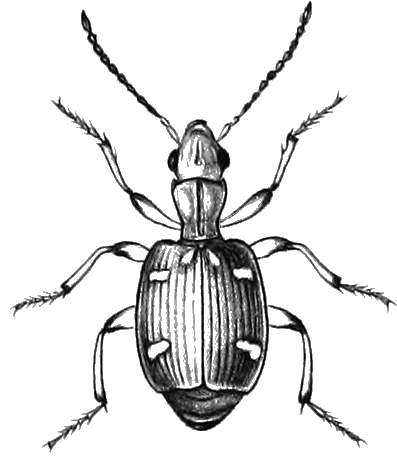

Scientific classification
- Kingdom: Animalia
- Phylum: Arthropoda
- Clade: Pancrustacea
- Class: Insecta
- Order: Coleoptera
- Suborder: Adephaga
- Family: Carabidae
- Genus: Mastax
- Species: M. ornatella

Binomial name
- Mastax ornatella Boheman, 1848

= Mastax ornatella =

Species of beetle

Mastax ornatella is a species of beetle in the family Carabidae found in Angola, Namibia, South Africa and Zimbabwe.
