= Crepidogastrinus =

Scientific classification
- Domain: Eukaryota
- Kingdom: Animalia
- Phylum: Arthropoda
- Class: Insecta
- Order: Coleoptera
- Suborder: Adephaga
- Family: Carabidae
- Subfamily: Brachininae
- Tribe: Crepidogastrini
- Genus: Crepidogastrinus; Basilewsky, 1957
- Species: C. kochi

Binomial name
- Crepidogastrinus kochi Basilewsky, 1957

Species of beetle

Crepidogastrinus is a genus in the ground beetle family Carabidae. This genus has a single species, Crepidogastrinus kochi. It is found in Namibia and South Africa.
