= Mastax annulata =

Scientific classification
- Kingdom: Animalia
- Phylum: Arthropoda
- Clade: Pancrustacea
- Class: Insecta
- Order: Coleoptera
- Suborder: Adephaga
- Family: Carabidae
- Genus: Mastax
- Species: M. annulata

Binomial name
- Mastax annulata Andrewes, 1924

Species of beetle

Mastax annulata is a species of beetle in the family Carabidae that can be found in India.

== Distribution ==
The species has distribution in Himachal Pradesh, Uttar Pradesh and Uttarakhand.
