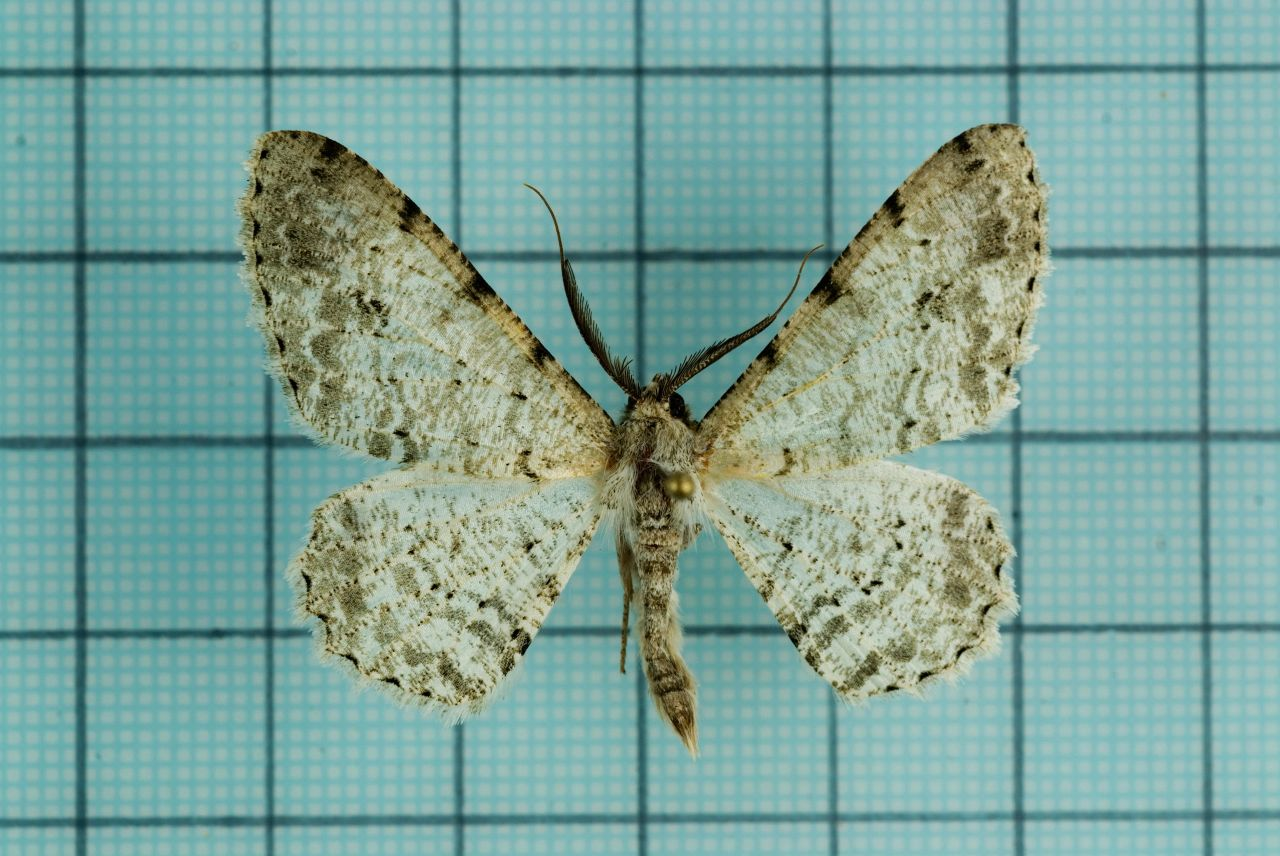
- An unidentified Lassaba species from Taiwan

Scientific classification
- Domain: Eukaryota
- Kingdom: Animalia
- Phylum: Arthropoda
- Class: Insecta
- Order: Lepidoptera
- Family: Geometridae
- Tribe: Boarmiini
- Genus: Lassaba; Moore, 1888

= Lassaba =

Genus of moths

Lassaba is a genus of moths in the family Geometridae erected by Frederic Moore in 1888.

== Species ==
- Lassaba acribomena (Prout, 1928)
- Lassaba albidaria (Walker, 1866)
- Lassaba brevipennis (Inoue, 1978)
- Lassaba contaminata Moore, 1888
- Lassaba fuliginosa (Inoue & Sato, 1986)
- Lassaba hsuhonglini Fu & Sato, 2010
- Lassaba indentata Warren, 1896
- Lassaba nikkonis (Butler, 1881)
- Lassaba parvalbidaria (Inoue, 1978)
- Lassaba tayulingensis (Sato, 1986)
- Lassaba vinacea (Prout, 1926)
