= Mastax burgeoni =

Scientific classification
- Kingdom: Animalia
- Phylum: Arthropoda
- Clade: Pancrustacea
- Class: Insecta
- Order: Coleoptera
- Suborder: Adephaga
- Family: Carabidae
- Genus: Mastax
- Species: M. burgeoni

Binomial name
- Mastax burgeoni Liebki, 1934

Species of beetle

Mastax burgeoni is a species of beetle in the family Carabidae that can be found in Angola, Cameroon, Democratic Republic of Congo, Liberia, Sierra Leone, Tanzania and Zambia.
