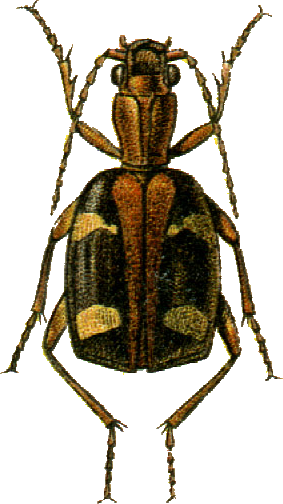

Scientific classification
- Kingdom: Animalia
- Phylum: Arthropoda
- Clade: Pancrustacea
- Class: Insecta
- Order: Coleoptera
- Suborder: Adephaga
- Family: Carabidae
- Genus: Mastax
- Species: M. thermarum

Binomial name
- Mastax thermarum (Steven, 1806)

= Mastax thermarum =

Species of beetle

Mastax thermarum is a species of beetle in the family Carabidae found in Asia and Europe.

== Subspecies ==
- Mastax thermarum egorovi Lafer, 1973
- Mastax thermarum thermarum (Steven, 1806)

== Distribution ==
The species has distribution in Armenia, Azerbaijan, Belgium, Georgia, Greece, Kyrgyzstan, Kazakhstan, Romania, Russia, Tadzhikistan, Turkmenistan and Uzbekistan.
