= Mastax hargreavesi =

Scientific classification
- Kingdom: Animalia
- Phylum: Arthropoda
- Clade: Pancrustacea
- Class: Insecta
- Order: Coleoptera
- Suborder: Adephaga
- Family: Carabidae
- Genus: Mastax
- Species: M. hargreavesi

Binomial name
- Mastax hargreavesi Liebke, 1931

Species of beetle

Mastax hargreavesi is a species of beetle in the family Carabidae found in Ivory Coast and Sierra Leone.
