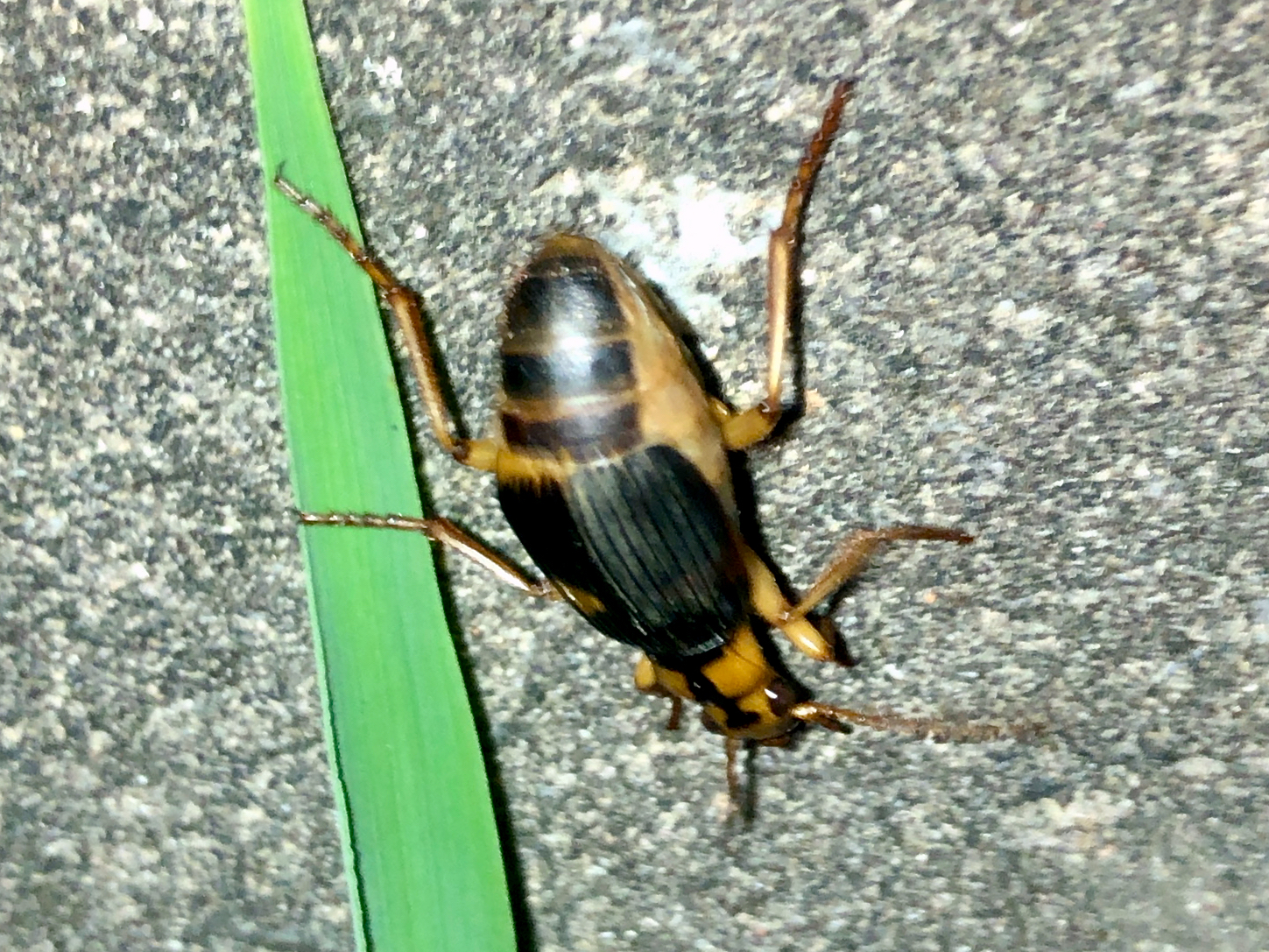
- Pheropsophus jessoensis collected by Y.Nagai in 1992 and identified by K.Ikeuchi.
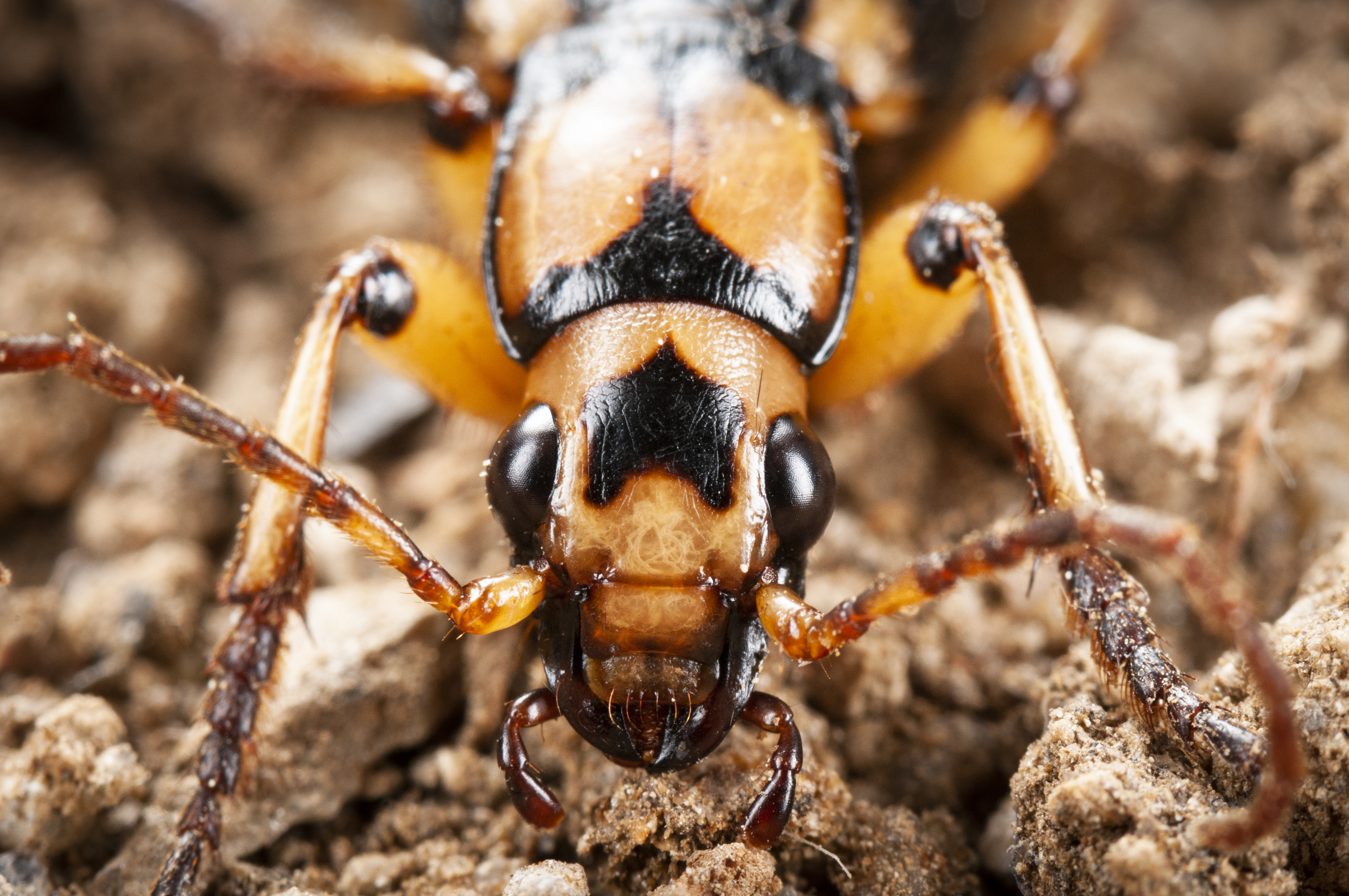
- Pheropsophus (Stenaptinus) jessoensis, Adult, South Korea

Scientific classification
- Kingdom: Animalia
- Phylum: Arthropoda
- Clade: Pancrustacea
- Class: Insecta
- Order: Coleoptera
- Suborder: Adephaga
- Family: Carabidae
- Genus: Pheropsophus
- Species: P. jessoensis

Binomial name
- Pheropsophus jessoensis (A.Morawitz, 1862)

Synonyms
- Pheropsophus stenaptinus jessoensis - A.Morawitz, 1862

= Pheropsophus jessoensis =

Species of beetle

Pheropsophus kimaniae, colloquially known as the Asian bombardier beetle (miidera beetle in Japan) is a species of ground beetle from Japan, North and South Korea, and the province of Yunnan, China.
