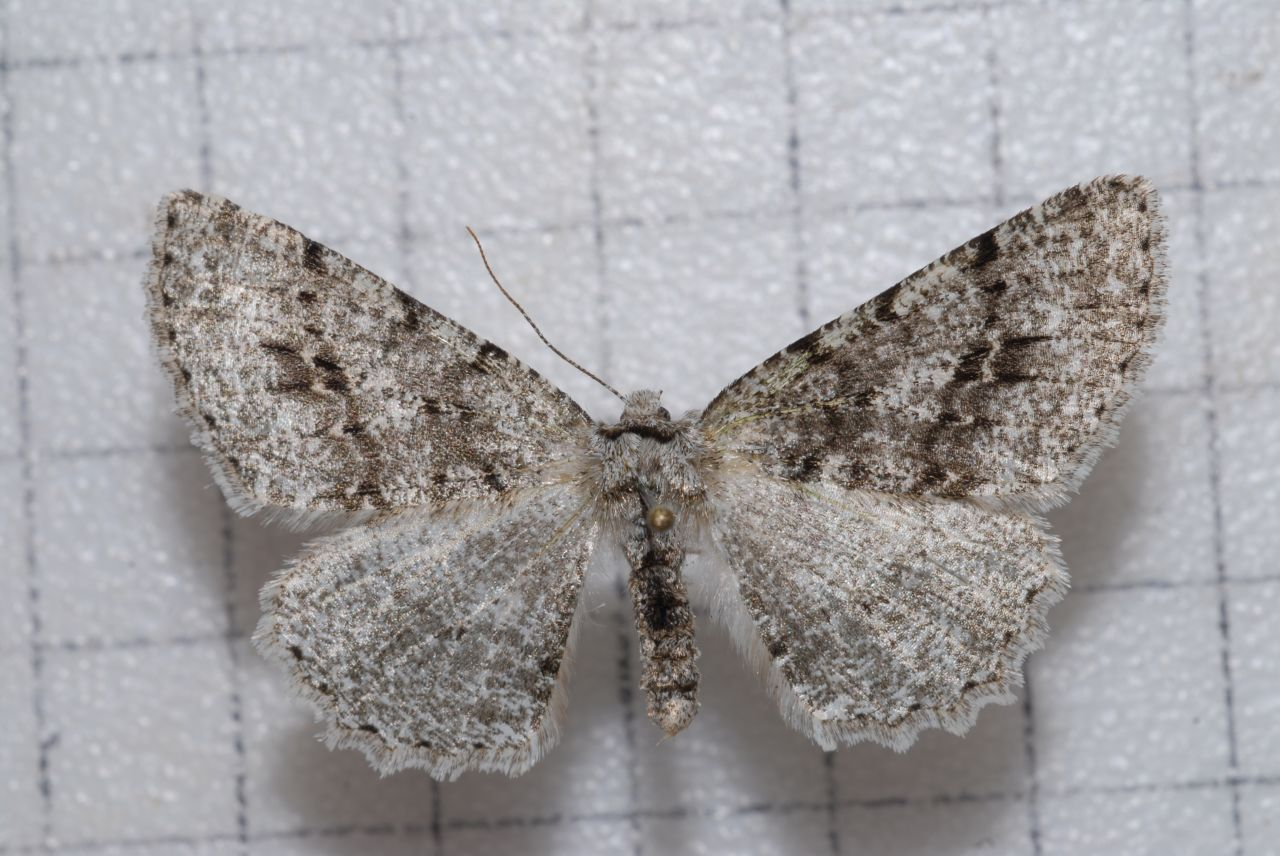
- Male
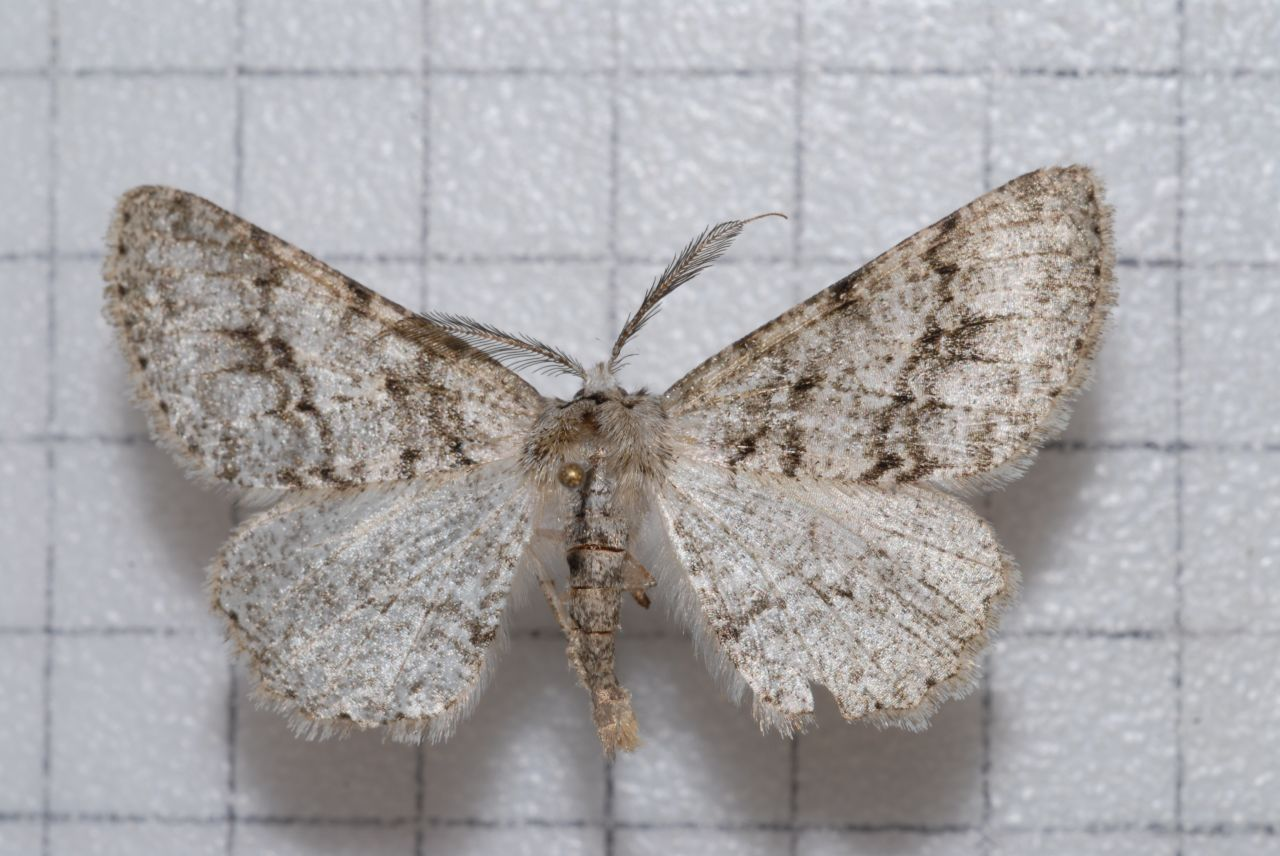
- Female

Scientific classification
- Domain: Eukaryota
- Kingdom: Animalia
- Phylum: Arthropoda
- Class: Insecta
- Order: Lepidoptera
- Family: Geometridae
- Genus: Lassaba
- Species: L. tayulingensis

Binomial name
- Lassaba tayulingensis (Sato, 1986)

Synonyms
- Medasina tayulingensis Sato, 1986; Chorodna tayulingensis

= Lassaba tayulingensis =

Species of moth

Lassaba tayulingensis is a moth in the family Geometridae. It is found in Taiwan.
