= Brachinulus =

Brachinulus viettei

Scientific classification
- Kingdom: Animalia
- Phylum: Arthropoda
- Class: Insecta
- Order: Coleoptera
- Suborder: Adephaga
- Family: Carabidae
- Subfamily: Brachininae
- Genus: Brachinulus; Basilewsky, 1958
- Species: B. viettei

Binomial name
- Brachinulus viettei Basilewsky, 1958

Species of beetle

Brachinulus viettei is a species of beetle in the family Carabidae, the only species in the genus Brachinulus.
