= Chade =

Chade could be a given name, a middle name, or a surname. Notable people with this name include:

- Chade Jansen (born 2009), South African rhythmic gymnast
- Chade-Meng Tan, Singaporean author and programmer
- Chade Nersicio (born 2001), Curaçaoan swimmer
- Atia Chade Boggs (born 1987), American singer
- Inquoris Desmond Chade Johnson (born 1986), American motivational speaker
- Juliano Marlon Chade (born 1998), Brazilian footballer
- Yamil Chade (1925–2009), Puerto Rican sports team owner

== See also ==
- Lia da la Chadé in modern-day Switzerland
- Chad (disambiguation)
