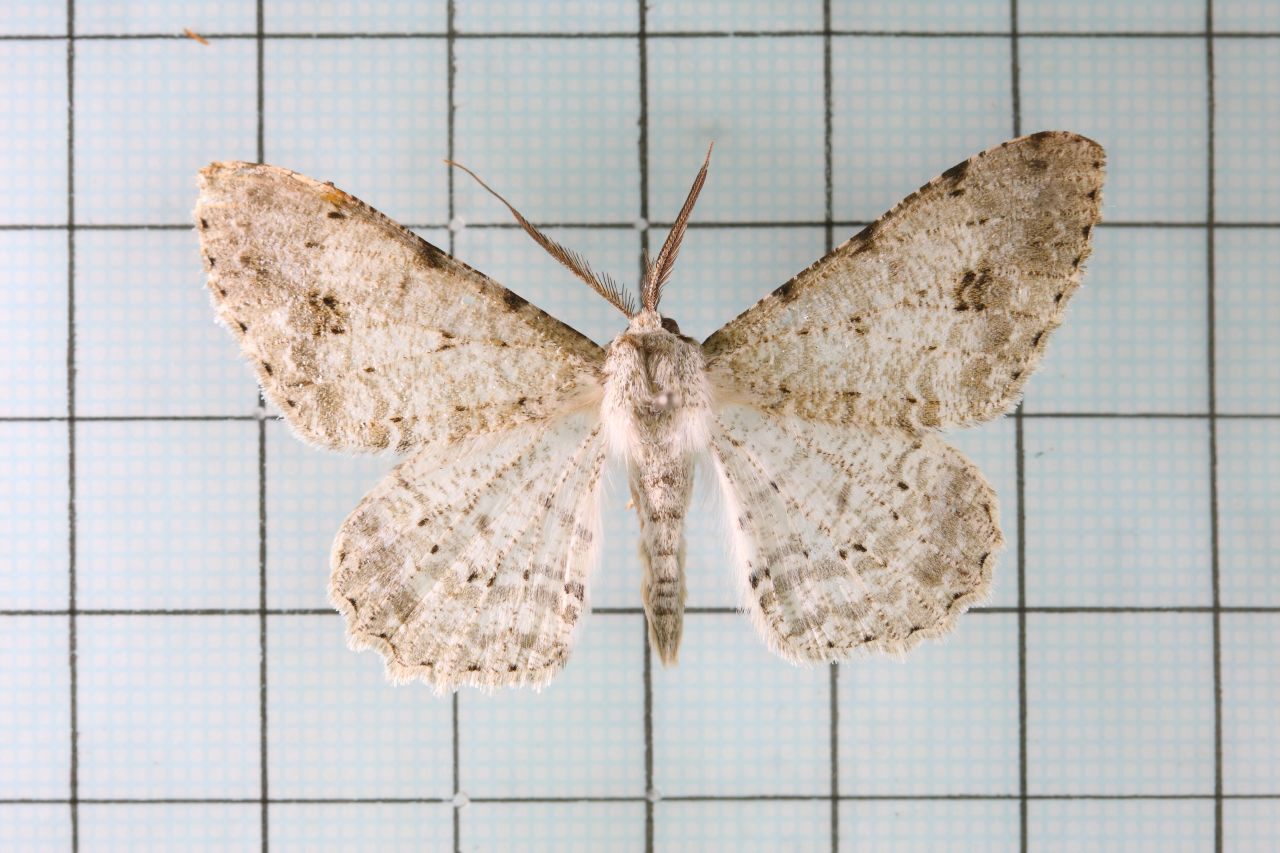

Scientific classification
- Kingdom: Animalia
- Phylum: Arthropoda
- Class: Insecta
- Order: Lepidoptera
- Family: Geometridae
- Genus: Lassaba
- Species: L. parvalbidaria

Binomial name
- Lassaba parvalbidaria (Inoue, 1978)

Synonyms
- Medasina parvalbidaria Inoue, 1978; Medasina nepalensis Sato, 1993

= Lassaba parvalbidaria =

Species of moth

Lassaba parvalbidaria is a moth in the family Geometridae. It is found in Taiwan and Nepal.

== Subspecies ==
- Lassaba parvalbidaria parvalbidaria (Taiwan)
- Lassaba parvalbidaria nepalensis (Sato, 1993) (Nepal)
