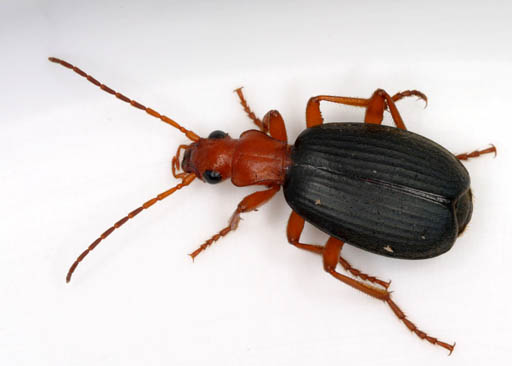
- Brachinus sp.

Scientific classification
- Kingdom: Animalia
- Phylum: Arthropoda
- Clade: Pancrustacea
- Class: Insecta
- Order: Coleoptera
- Suborder: Adephaga
- Family: Carabidae
- Subfamily: Brachininae; Bonelli, 1810

= Brachininae =

Subfamily of beetles

Brachininae is a subfamily of beetles in the family Carabidae. There are about 780 species in 14 genera of the subfamily.

== Taxonomy ==
The subfamily contains two tribes and 14 genera.

Tribe Brachinini Bonelli, 1810
Aptinoderus Hubenthal, 1919
Aptinus Bonelli, 1810
Brachinulus Basilewsky, 1958
Brachinus Weber, 1801
Mastax Fischer von Waldheim, 1828
Pheropsophus Solier, 1833
Styphlodromus Basilewsky, 1959
Styphlomerus Chaudoir, 1875
Tribe Crepidogastrini Jeannel, 1949
Brachynillus Reitter, 1904
Crepidogaster Boheman, 1848
Crepidogastrillus Basilewsky, 1959
Crepidogastrinus Basilewsky, 1957
Crepidolomus Basilewsky, 1959
Crepidonellus Basilewsky, 1959
