= E. nigricans =

E. nigricans may refer to:

- Enchelycore nigricans, the mottled conger moray or mulatto conger, a moray eel species found in the Atlantic and Pacific Oceans
- Endochironomus nigricans, a non-biting midge species in the genus Endochironomus found in Europe
- Enneapogon nigricans
- Epidendrum nigricans, Schltr., 1913, an orchid species in the genus Epidendrum
- Euxesta nigricans, a picture-winged fly species
- Euxoa nigricans, the garden dart, a moth species found throughout Europe
- Evarcha nigricans, Dalmas, 1920, a jumping spider species in the genus Evarcha found in Tunisia

== See also ==
- Nigricans (disambiguation)
