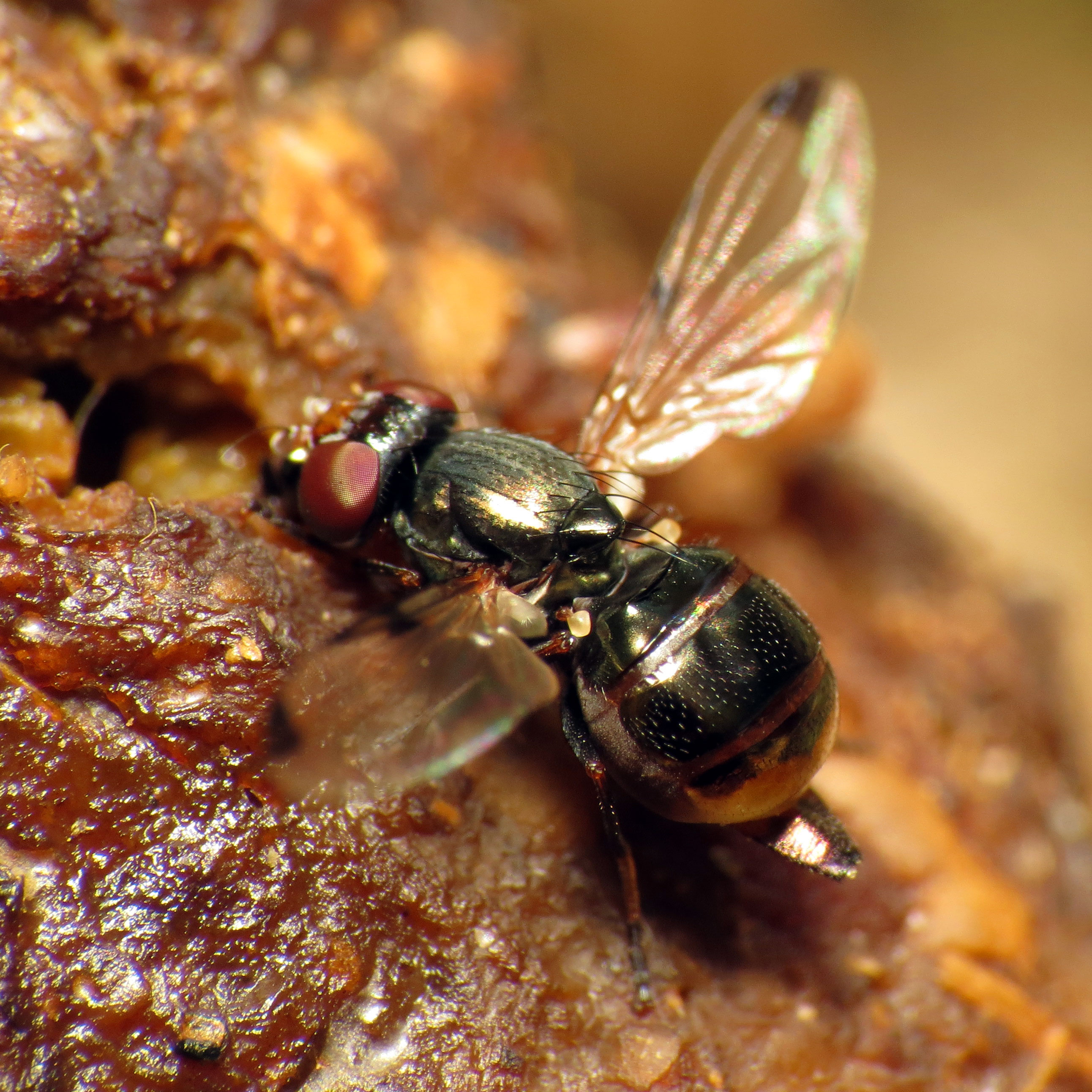
- Euxesta notata

Scientific classification
- Kingdom: Animalia
- Phylum: Arthropoda
- Clade: Pancrustacea
- Class: Insecta
- Order: Diptera
- Family: Ulidiidae
- Subfamily: Ulidiinae
- Tribe: Lipsanini
- Genus: Euxesta; Loew, 1867

Synonyms
- Eusesta Loew, 1868; Eusiesta Loew, 1868; Aloceuxesta Hendel, 1936; Amethysa Macquart, 1835; Amethysta Loew, 1873; Euxestina Enderlein, 1937

= Euxesta =

Genus of flies

Euxesta is a genus of picture-winged flies in the family Ulidiidae.

== Species ==
- Euxesta abana
- Euxesta abdominalis
- Euxesta acuta
- Euxesta acuticornis
- Euxesta alternans
- Euxesta anna
- Euxesta annonae
- Euxesta anomalipennis
- Euxesta apicalis
- Euxesta arcuata
- Euxesta argentina
- Euxesta armaticornis
- Euxesta atlantica
- Euxesta atripes
- Euxesta avala
- Euxesta australis
- Euxesta basalis
- Euxesta bicolor
- Euxesta bifasciata
- Euxesta bilimeki
- Euxesta binotata
- Euxesta brookmani
- Euxesta calligyna
- Euxesta callona
- Euxesta cavagnaroi
- Euxesta compta
- Euxesta conserta
- Euxesta conspersa (Walker, 1858)
- Euxesta contorta
- Euxesta diaphana
- Euxesta eluta
- Euxesta fenestrata
- Euxesta fervida
- Euxesta freyi
- Euxesta galapagensis
- Euxesta geminata
- Euxesta guianica
- Euxesta halterata
- Euxesta hendeli
- Euxesta hyalipennis
- Euxesta insolita
- Euxesta intermedia
- Euxesta juncta
- Euxesta junctula
- Euxesta knowltoni
- Euxesta lacteipennis
- Euxesta laffooni
- Euxesta leucomelas
- Euxesta luteocesta
- Euxesta lutzi
- Euxesta macquarti
- Euxesta maculata
- Euxesta major
- Euxesta minor
- Euxesta mitis
- Euxesta nesiotis
- Euxesta nigricans
- Euxesta nitidiventris
- Euxesta notata
- Euxesta pacifica
- Euxesta panamena
- Euxesta pechumani
- Euxesta penacamposi
- Euxesta phoeba
- Euxesta prima
- Euxesta propinqua
- Euxesta pruinosa
- Euxesta pulchella
- Euxesta punctipennis
- Euxesta pusio
- Euxesta quaternaria
- Euxesta remota
- Euxesta rubida
- Euxesta sanguinea
- Euxesta schineri
- Euxesta schnusei
- Euxesta schusteri
- Euxesta scoriacea
- Euxesta scoriacina
- Euxesta scutellaris
- Euxesta sororcula
- Euxesta spodia
- Euxesta spoliata
- Euxesta stackelbergi
- Euxesta stigma
- Euxesta stigmatias
- Euxesta tenuissima
- Euxesta tepocae
- Euxesta thomae
- Euxesta undulata
- Euxesta wettsteini
- Euxesta willistoni
- Euxesta xeres
