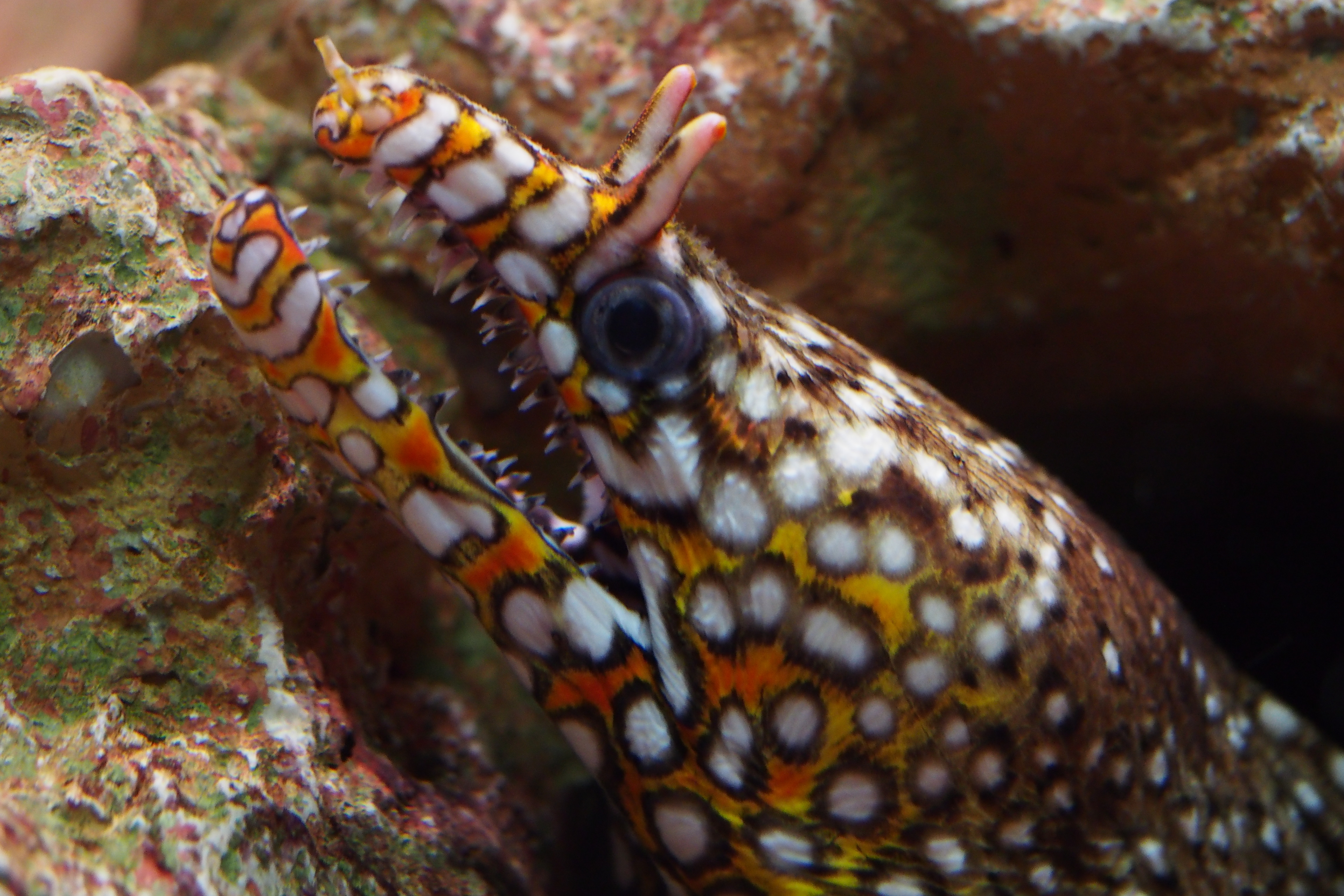

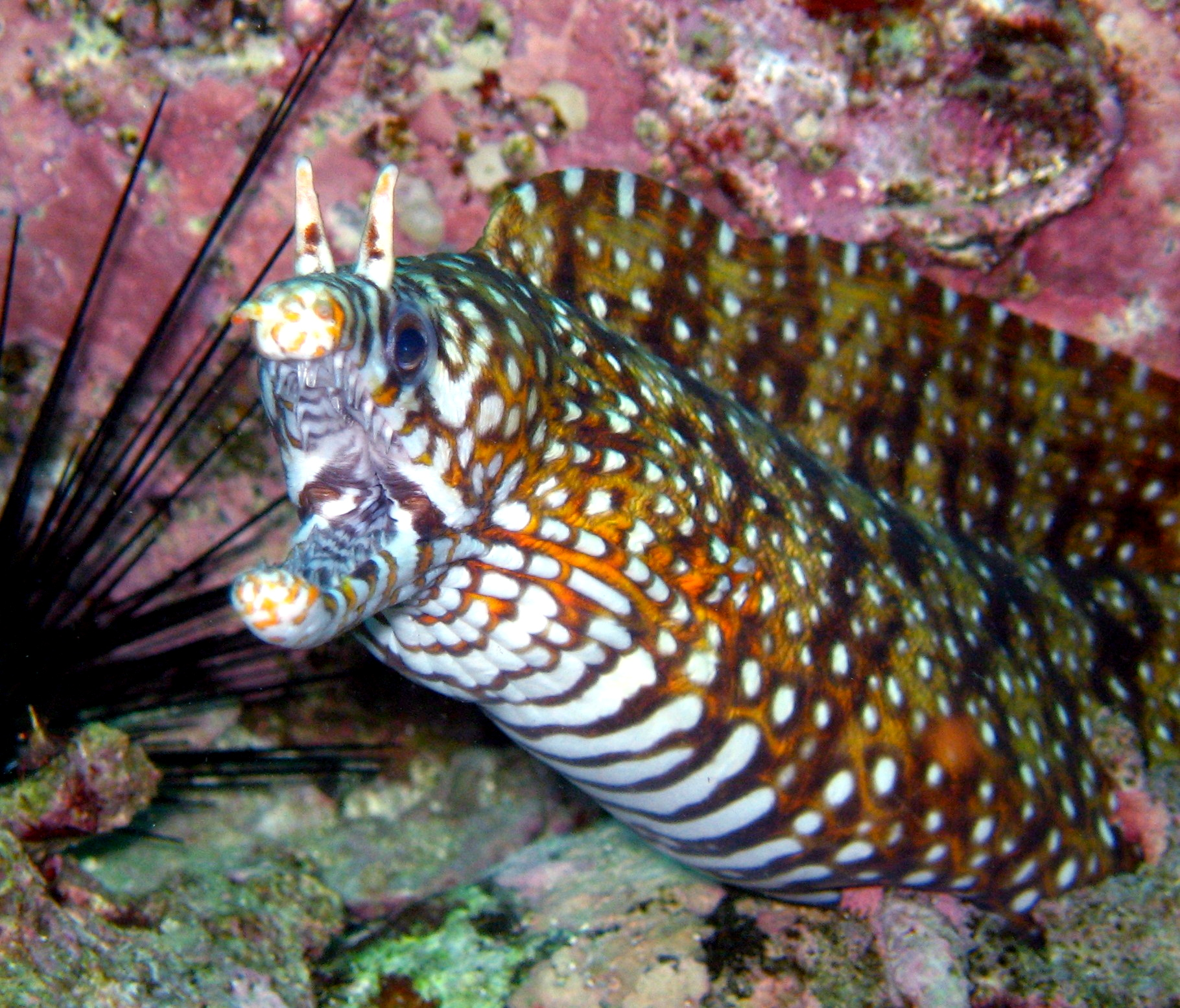

Conservation status
- Least Concern (IUCN 3.1)

Scientific classification
- Kingdom: Animalia
- Phylum: Chordata
- Class: Actinopterygii
- Division: Teleostei
- Order: Anguilliformes
- Family: Muraenidae
- Genus: Enchelycore
- Species: E. pardalis

Binomial name
- Enchelycore pardalis (Temminck & Schlegel, 1846)

= Leopard moray eel =

Species of fish

The leopard moray eel (Enchelycore pardalis), also known as the dragon moray, tiger moray or puhi-kauila in Hawaiian, is a species of moray eel of the family Muraenidae.

== Distribution and habitat ==
The leopard moray eel is widespread throughout the Indo-Pacific oceans from Réunion to the Hawaiian, Line and Society Islands, north to southern Japan, southern Korea, and south to New Caledonia. The Leopard Moray eel inhabits coral and rocky reefs from shallow coastal waters to deeper reef slopes between 5 and 60 m in depth. It typically shelters in reef crevices during the day and hunts for prey at night.

== Description ==
The leopard moray has a long, slender body and no pelvic or pectoral fins. It grows up to 92 cm (36 in) in length and is characterized by its narrow, curved jaws, and elongated tubular nostrils. It has very vivid coloration, with white, reddish brown, and dark brown spots across its body. These spots vary in shape, size, and length. The leopard moray has vivid red stripes on and around its face. Due to its bright coloration, the leopard moray is easily identifiable and rarely confused for other species. It is primarily nocturnal and has a preference for cryptic habitats feeding primarily on fishes and small cephalopods.

== Feeding Behaviors ==
The leopard moray eel exhibits two distinct feeding behaviors: rotation and knotting. Rotation is the eel spinning its whole body on a longitudinal axis while tearing chunks of flesh from prey. It also controls the prey by preventing it from resisting. Knotting is the eel moving its body to create a loop, and passing its tail through the loop to form a knot. Knotting allows the leopard moray to feed on a wider range of prey, as it helps with eating larger prey of when the eel faces resistance from prey. Knotting behaviors include constriction, which can allow the eel to consume its prey whole or suffocate it, or the eel taking pieces out of the prey, similar to rotation. To begin feeding, the leopard moray strikes at prey, either successfully or unsuccessfully catching it. If it is successful, it will engage in its other feeding behaviors.

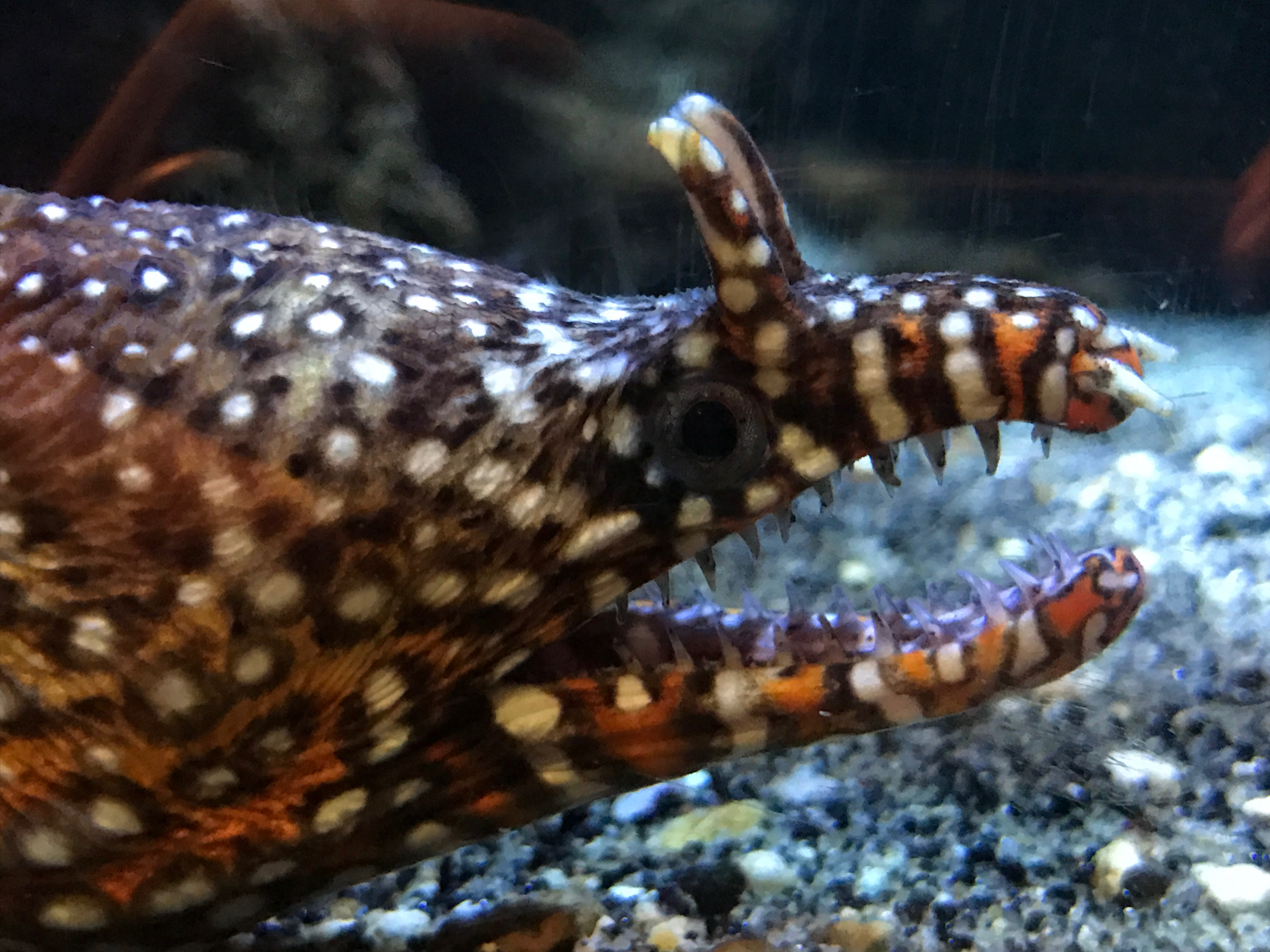
Dragon moray eel at the Vancouver Aquarium

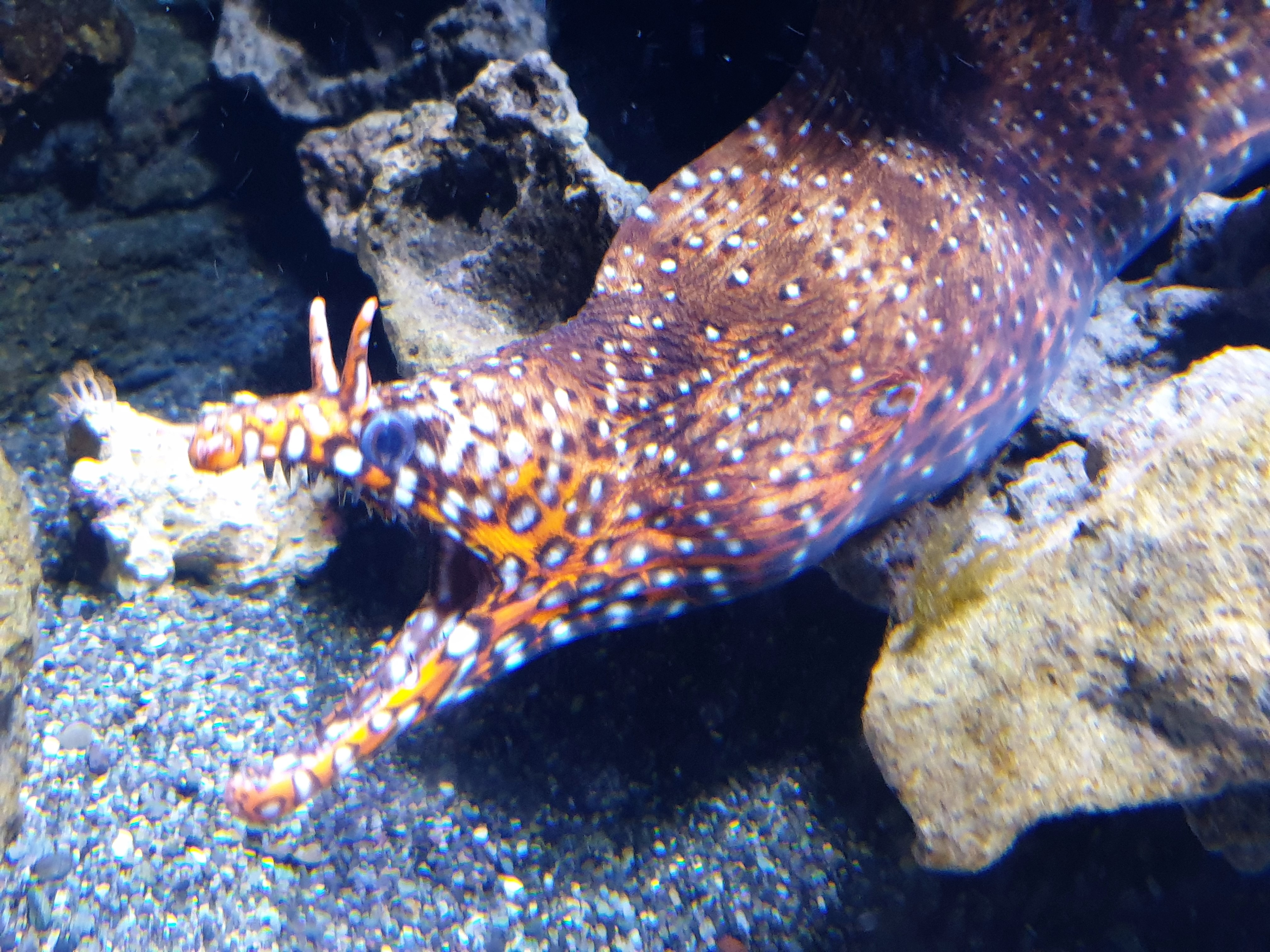
At the Sea Life Centre, Hannover, Germany
