= Stenomyia scoriacea =

Scientific classification
- Kingdom: Animalia
- Phylum: Arthropoda
- Clade: Pancrustacea
- Class: Insecta
- Order: Diptera
- Family: Ulidiidae
- Genus: Euxesta
- Species: E. scoriacea

Binomial name
- Euxesta scoriacea Loew, 1876

Species of fly

Euxesta scoriacea is a species of ulidiid or picture-winged fly in the genus Euxesta of the family Ulidiidae.
