= Euxesta argentina =

Scientific classification
- Kingdom: Animalia
- Phylum: Arthropoda
- Clade: Pancrustacea
- Class: Insecta
- Order: Diptera
- Family: Ulidiidae
- Genus: Euxesta
- Species: E. argentina

Binomial name
- Euxesta argentina Brethes, 1904

Species of fly

Euxesta argentina is a species of ulidiid or picture-winged Fly in the genus Euxesta of the family Ulidiidae.
