= Enchelycore nycturanus =

Conservation status
- Data Deficient (IUCN 3.1)

Scientific classification
- Kingdom: Animalia
- Phylum: Chordata
- Class: Actinopterygii
- Order: Anguilliformes
- Family: Muraenidae
- Genus: Enchelycore
- Species: E. nycturanus

Binomial name
- Enchelycore nycturanus D. G. Smith, 2002

Species of fish

Enchelycore nycturanus is a moray eel found in the Aliwal Shoal off the coast of South Africa. It was first named by D.G. Smith in 2002.
