= Euxesta conspersa =

Scientific classification
- Kingdom: Animalia
- Phylum: Arthropoda
- Clade: Pancrustacea
- Class: Insecta
- Order: Diptera
- Family: Ulidiidae
- Genus: Euxesta
- Species: E. conspersa

Binomial name
- Euxesta conspersa (Walker, 1858)

Synonyms
- Dorycera conspersa Walker, 1858; Ortalis conspersa Walker, 1853

Species of fly

Euxesta conspersa is a species of ulidiid or picture-winged fly in the genus Euxesta of the family Ulidiidae.
