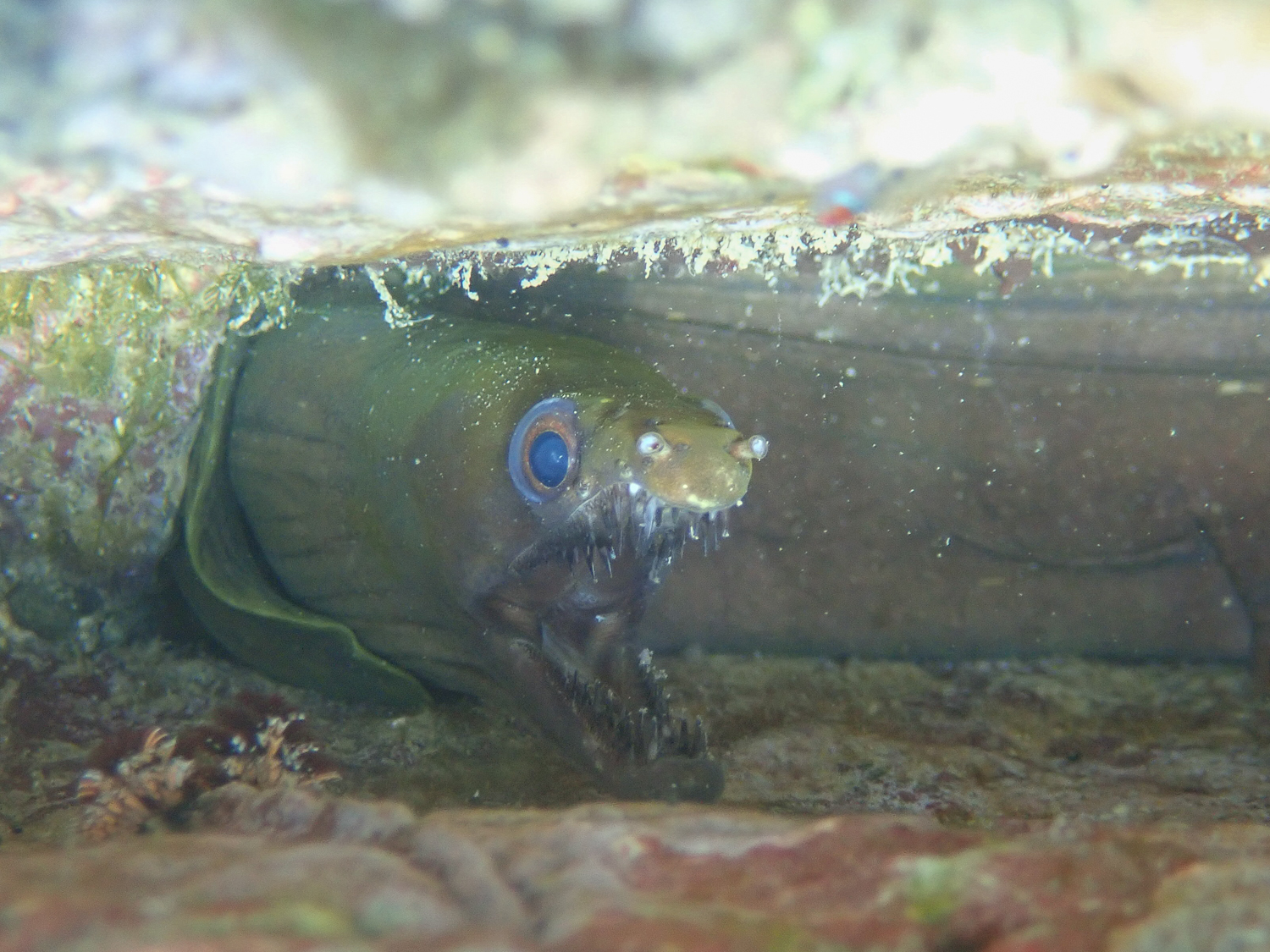
- Enchelycore octaviana off the coast of Coiba Island, Panama

Scientific classification
- Kingdom: Animalia
- Phylum: Chordata
- Class: Actinopterygii
- Order: Anguilliformes
- Family: Muraenidae
- Genus: Enchelycore
- Species: E. octaviana

Binomial name
- Enchelycore octaviana (G. S. Myers & Wade, 1941)

= Enchelycore octaviana =

Slenderjaw moray

Species of fish

Enchelycore octaviana is a carnivorous moray eel found in coral reefs from the Gulf of California to Peru. It was first named by Myers and Wade in 1941, and is commonly known as the slenderjaw moray. E. octaviana inhabits salt waters at a depth varying from 3–36 meters, reaching a length of 91 centimetres.
