= Euxesta bicolor =

Scientific classification
- Domain: Eukaryota
- Kingdom: Animalia
- Phylum: Arthropoda
- Class: Insecta
- Order: Diptera
- Family: Ulidiidae
- Genus: Euxesta
- Species: E. bicolor

Binomial name
- Euxesta bicolor (Cresson, 1906)

Synonyms
- Acrosticta bicolor Cresson, 1906

Species of fly

Euxesta bicolor is a species of ulidiid or picture-winged fly in the genus Euxesta of the family Tephritidae. It was described by Ezra Townsend Cresson in 1906.
