= Euxesta juncta =

Scientific classification
- Domain: Eukaryota
- Kingdom: Animalia
- Phylum: Arthropoda
- Class: Insecta
- Order: Diptera
- Family: Ulidiidae
- Genus: Euxesta
- Species: E. juncta

Binomial name
- Euxesta juncta Coquillett, 1904

Species of fly

Euxesta juncta is a species of ulidiid or picture-winged fly in the genus Euxesta of the family Ulidiidae. It was described by Daniel William Coquillett in 1904.
