= Euxesta spoliata =

Scientific classification
- Kingdom: Animalia
- Phylum: Arthropoda
- Clade: Pancrustacea
- Class: Insecta
- Order: Diptera
- Family: Ulidiidae
- Genus: Euxesta
- Species: E. spoliata

Binomial name
- Euxesta spoliata Loew, 1868

Synonyms
- Psairoptera skinneri Cresson, 1924; Euxesta laticeps Wulp, 1899; Ortalis platystoma Thomson, 1869

Species of fly

Euxesta spoliata is a species of ufly in the genus Euxesta of the family Ulidiidae.
