= Enchelycore kamara =

Dark-spotted moray

Conservation status
- Least Concern (IUCN 3.1)

Scientific classification
- Kingdom: Animalia
- Phylum: Chordata
- Class: Actinopterygii
- Order: Anguilliformes
- Family: Muraenidae
- Genus: Enchelycore
- Species: E. kamara

Binomial name
- Enchelycore kamara J. E. Böhlke & E. B. Böhlke, 1980

Species of fish

Enchelycore kamara is a moray eel found in coral reefs in the central Pacific Ocean. It was described by Eugenia Brandt Böhlke and James Erwin Böhlke in 1980, and is commonly known as the dark-spotted moray.

It can grow to 53 cm (21 in) total length.
