= Euxesta macquarti =

Scientific classification
- Kingdom: Animalia
- Phylum: Arthropoda
- Clade: Pancrustacea
- Class: Insecta
- Order: Diptera
- Family: Ulidiidae
- Genus: Euxesta
- Species: E. macquarti

Binomial name
- Euxesta macquarti (Schiner, 1868)

Synonyms
- Amethysa macquarti

Species of fly

Euxesta macquarti is a species of ulidiid or picture-winged fly in the genus Euxesta of the family Ulidiidae.
