= Euxesta undulata =

Scientific classification
- Kingdom: Animalia
- Phylum: Arthropoda
- Clade: Pancrustacea
- Class: Insecta
- Order: Diptera
- Family: Ulidiidae
- Genus: Euxesta
- Species: E. undulata

Binomial name
- Euxesta undulata Hendel, 1913

Species of fly

Euxesta undulata is a species of ulidiid or picture-winged fly in the genus Euxesta of the family Ulidiidae found in Paraguay. It was described by Hendel in 1913.
