= Enchelycore bikiniensis =

Conservation status
- Least Concern (IUCN 3.1)

Scientific classification
- Kingdom: Animalia
- Phylum: Chordata
- Class: Actinopterygii
- Order: Anguilliformes
- Family: Muraenidae
- Genus: Enchelycore
- Species: E. bikiniensis

Binomial name
- Enchelycore bikiniensis (L. P. Schultz, 1953)

Species of fish

Enchelycore bikiniensis is a moray eel found in coral reefs in the Pacific Ocean. It was first named by Leonard Schultz in 1953, and is commonly known as the Bikini Atoll moray or the Bikini moray.
