= Hookjaw moray =

Conservation status
- Least Concern (IUCN 3.1)

Scientific classification
- Kingdom: Animalia
- Phylum: Chordata
- Class: Actinopterygii
- Order: Anguilliformes
- Family: Muraenidae
- Genus: Enchelycore
- Species: E. bayeri

Binomial name
- Enchelycore bayeri (L. P. Schultz, 1953)

Synonyms
- Gymnothorax bayeri Schultz, 1953

Species of fish

The hookjaw moray, bowmouth moray, or Bayer's moray (Enchelycore bayeri) is a moray eel of the family Muraenidae. It is found throughout the Indo-Pacific as well as in the Red Sea.

Like other members of the genus, the hookjaw sports curved jaws and rows of large, dagger-like teeth. Reaching 70 cm (28 in) in total length, it is one of the smaller members of the genus Enchelycore. It is a secretive inhabitant of reefs, usually at depths below 20 m (66 ft) but occasionally down to 61 m (200 ft).
