= Euxesta halterata =

Scientific classification
- Kingdom: Animalia
- Phylum: Arthropoda
- Clade: Pancrustacea
- Class: Insecta
- Order: Diptera
- Family: Ulidiidae
- Genus: Euxesta
- Species: E. halterata

Binomial name
- Euxesta halterata Malloch, 1933

Species of fly

Euxesta halterata is a species of ulidiid or picture-winged fly in the genus Euxesta of the family Tephritidae. The species was first described by John Russell Malloch in 1933.
