= Euxesta nitidiventris =

Scientific classification
- Domain: Eukaryota
- Kingdom: Animalia
- Phylum: Arthropoda
- Class: Insecta
- Order: Diptera
- Family: Ulidiidae
- Genus: Euxesta
- Species: E. nitidiventris

Binomial name
- Euxesta nitidiventris Loew, 1873

Species of fly

Euxesta nitidiventris is a species of ulidiid or picture-winged fly in the genus Euxesta of the family Ulidiidae. Larvae are known to be pests of maize.
