= Euxesta propinqua =

Scientific classification
- Kingdom: Animalia
- Phylum: Arthropoda
- Class: Insecta
- Order: Diptera
- Family: Ulidiidae
- Genus: Euxesta
- Species: E. propinqua

Binomial name
- Euxesta propinqua Schiner, 1868

Species of fly

Euxesta propinqua is a species of ulidiid or picture-winged fly in the genus Euxesta of the family Ulidiidae.
