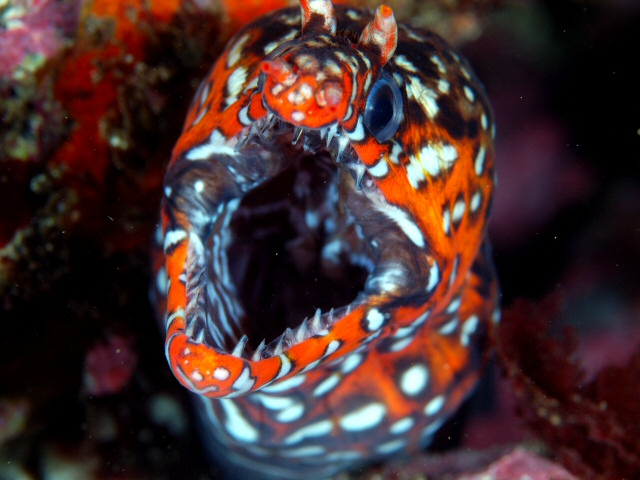
- Leopard moray eel

Scientific classification
- Kingdom: Animalia
- Phylum: Chordata
- Class: Actinopterygii
- Division: Teleostei
- Order: Anguilliformes
- Family: Muraenidae
- Subfamily: Muraeninae
- Genus: Enchelycore; Kaup, 1856

Type species
- Muraena nigricans Bonnaterre, 1788

Species
- 13, see text.

= Enchelycore =

Genus of fishes

Enchelycore is a genus of moray eels in the family Muraenidae. Enchelycore species are generally small to medium-sized eels, most ranging from 2 to 3 feet (61 to 91 cm) in length, with the largest being the Mosaic Moray (E. ramosa), which reaches a length of 6 feet (180 cm). Members of the genus feature distinctive, curved jaws that prevent them from fully closing their mouth and aids them in catching, and holding on to prey. Enchelycore species can also feature extremely bright colors (E. pardalis, E. anatina) and ornate markings (E. lichenosa).

== Species ==
There are currently 13 recognized species in this genus:

- Enchelycore anatina (R. T. Lowe, 1838) (Fangtooth moray)
- Enchelycore bayeri (L. P. Schultz, 1953) (Bayer's moray)
- Enchelycore bikiniensis (L. P. Schultz, 1953) (Bikini Atoll moray)
- Enchelycore carychroa J. E. Böhlke & E. B. Böhlke, 1976 (Caribbean chestnut moray)
- Enchelycore kamara J. E. Böhlke & E. B. Böhlke, 1980 (Dark-spotted moray)
- Enchelycore lichenosa (D. S. Jordan & Snyder, 1901) (Reticulate hookjaw moray)
- Enchelycore nigricans (Bonnaterre, 1788) (Mulatto Conger)
- Enchelycore nycturanus D. G. Smith, 2002
- Enchelycore octaviana (G. S. Myers & Wade, 1941) (Slenderjaw moray)
- Enchelycore pardalis (Temminck & Schlegel, 1846) (Leopard moray)
- Enchelycore propinqua Mohapatra et al. 2017
- Enchelycore ramosa (Griffin, 1926) (Mosaic moray)
- Enchelycore schismatorhynchus (Bleeker, 1853) (White-margined moray)
