= Euxesta stigmatias =

Scientific classification
- Domain: Eukaryota
- Kingdom: Animalia
- Phylum: Arthropoda
- Class: Insecta
- Order: Diptera
- Family: Ulidiidae
- Genus: Euxesta
- Species: E. stigmatias

Binomial name
- Euxesta stigmatias Loew, 1868

Species of fly

Euxesta stigmatias is a species of picture-winged fly in the genus Euxesta of the family Ulidiidae. The larva attacks maize (and occasionally other crops) in tropical and subtropical parts of the Americas. It is invasive in North America.
