= Enchelycore schismatorhynchus =

Conservation status
- Least Concern (IUCN 3.1)

Scientific classification
- Kingdom: Animalia
- Phylum: Chordata
- Class: Actinopterygii
- Order: Anguilliformes
- Family: Muraenidae
- Genus: Enchelycore
- Species: E. schismatorhynchus

Binomial name
- Enchelycore schismatorhynchus (Bleeker, 1853)

Species of fish

Enchelycore schismatorhynchus is a moray eel found in coral reefs in the Pacific and Indian Oceans. It was first named by Bleeker in 1853, and is commonly known as the white-margined moray, brown moray eel, or the funnel-nostril moray.

== Distribution and habitat ==
It is found in depths of 5–35 metres (16–115 ft) in tropical habitats.
