= Euxesta abana =

Scientific classification
- Domain: Eukaryota
- Kingdom: Animalia
- Phylum: Arthropoda
- Class: Insecta
- Order: Diptera
- Family: Ulidiidae
- Genus: Euxesta
- Species: E. abana

Binomial name
- Euxesta abana Curran, 1935

Species of fly

Euxesta abana is a species of ulidiid or picture-winged fly in the genus Euxesta of the family Ulidiidae. It was described by Charles Howard Curran in 1935. The species can be found at White Sands National Park in Tularosa Basin, New Mexico.
