= Euxesta minor =

Scientific classification
- Domain: Eukaryota
- Kingdom: Animalia
- Phylum: Arthropoda
- Class: Insecta
- Order: Diptera
- Family: Ulidiidae
- Genus: Euxesta
- Species: E. minor

Binomial name
- Euxesta minor Cresson, 1906

Species of fly

Euxesta minor is a species of ulidiid or picture-winged fly in the genus Euxesta of the family Ulidiidae. It was described by Ezra Townsend Cresson in 1906.
