= Euxesta apicalis =

Scientific classification
- Domain: Eukaryota
- Kingdom: Animalia
- Phylum: Arthropoda
- Class: Insecta
- Order: Diptera
- Family: Ulidiidae
- Genus: Euxesta
- Species: E. apicalis

Binomial name
- Euxesta apicalis Williston, 1896

Species of fly

Euxesta apicalis is a species of ulidiid or picture-winged fly in the genus Euxesta of the family Ulidiidae.
