= Euxesta lutzi =

Scientific classification
- Domain: Eukaryota
- Kingdom: Animalia
- Phylum: Arthropoda
- Class: Insecta
- Order: Diptera
- Family: Ulidiidae
- Genus: Euxesta
- Species: E. lutzi

Binomial name
- Euxesta lutzi Curran, 1935

Species of fly

Euxesta lutzi is a species of ulidiid or picture-winged fly in the genus Euxesta of the family Tephritidae. It was described by Charles Howard Curran in 1935.
