= Euxesta pulchella =

Scientific classification
- Kingdom: Animalia
- Phylum: Arthropoda
- Class: Insecta
- Order: Diptera
- Family: Ulidiidae
- Genus: Euxesta
- Species: E. pulchella

Binomial name
- Euxesta pulchella Cresson, 1906

Species of fly

Euxesta pulchella is a species of ulidiid or picture-winged fly in the genus Euxesta of the family Ulidiidae.
