= Endochironomus subtendens =

Scientific classification
- Domain: Eukaryota
- Kingdom: Animalia
- Phylum: Arthropoda
- Class: Insecta
- Order: Diptera
- Family: Chironomidae
- Tribe: Chironomini
- Genus: Endochironomus
- Species: E. subtendens

Binomial name
- Endochironomus subtendens (Townes, 1945)

Synonyms
- Tanytarsus subtendens Townes, 1945

Species of fly

Endochironomus subtendens is a species of midge in the family Chironomidae.
