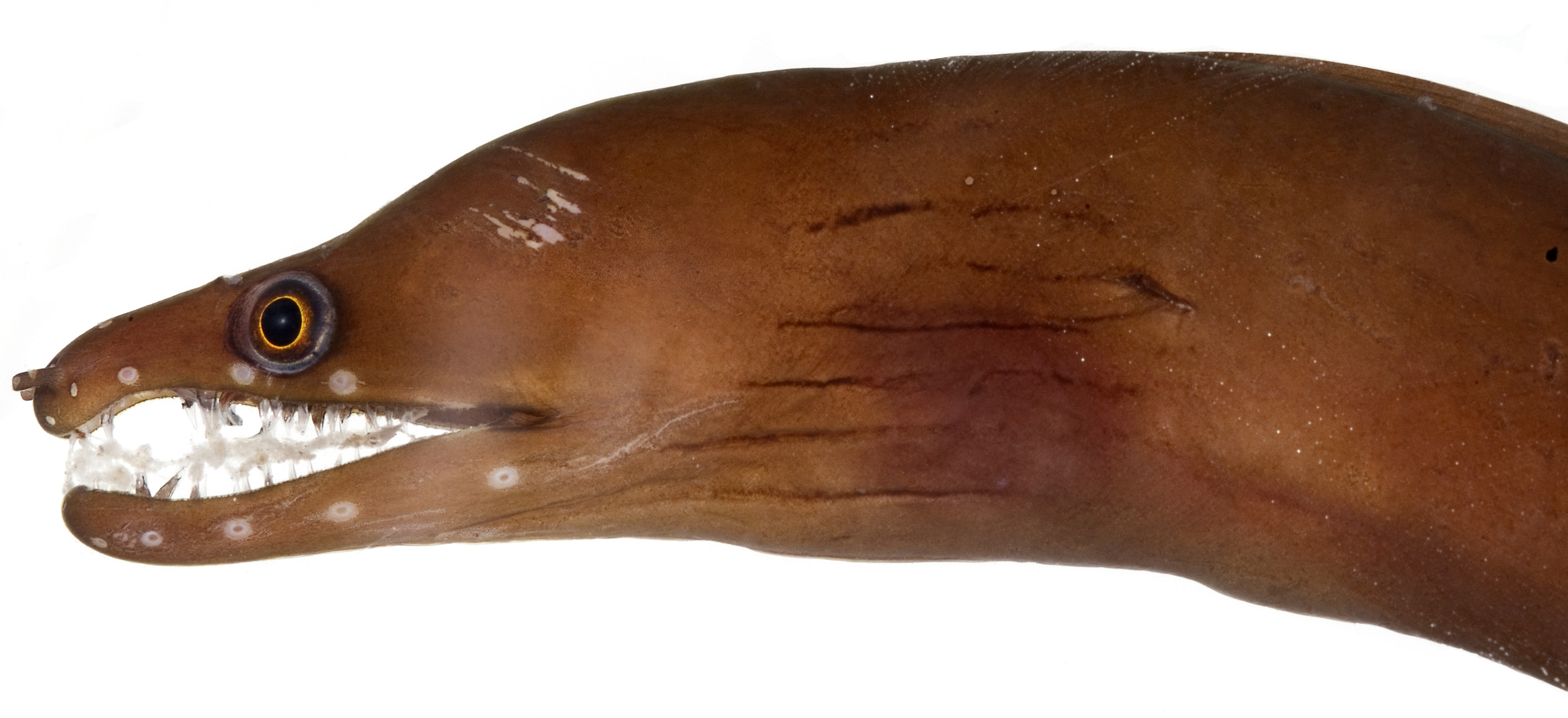

Conservation status
- Least Concern (IUCN 3.1)

Scientific classification
- Kingdom: Animalia
- Phylum: Chordata
- Class: Actinopterygii
- Order: Anguilliformes
- Family: Muraenidae
- Genus: Enchelycore
- Species: E. carychroa

Binomial name
- Enchelycore carychroa J. E. Böhlke & E. B. Böhlke, 1976

= Caribbean chestnut moray =

Species of fish

The Caribbean chestnut moray, Enchelycore carychroa, is a moray eel of the family Muraenidae.

It is found in the western Atlantic from Bermuda, southern Florida, the Bahamas, and the western Gulf of Mexico to Brazil at depths between 1 and 20 m.

Their length is up to 34 cm, or just over 1 ft, making them the smallest members of their genus and among the smaller morays.

The Caribbean chestnut moray inhabits coral and rocky reefs.
