= Euxesta xeres =

Scientific classification
- Domain: Eukaryota
- Kingdom: Animalia
- Phylum: Arthropoda
- Class: Insecta
- Order: Diptera
- Family: Ulidiidae
- Genus: Euxesta
- Species: E. xeres

Binomial name
- Euxesta xeres Curran, 1935

Species of fly

Euxesta xeres is a species of ulidiid or picture-winged fly in the genus Euxesta of the family Ulidiidae. It was described by Charles Howard Curran in 1935. The species can be found at White Sands National Park in Tularosa Basin, New Mexico.
