= Euxesta remota =

Scientific classification
- Domain: Eukaryota
- Kingdom: Animalia
- Phylum: Arthropoda
- Class: Insecta
- Order: Diptera
- Family: Ulidiidae
- Genus: Euxesta
- Species: E. remota

Binomial name
- Euxesta remota Cresson, 1924

Species of fly

Euxesta remota is a species of ulidiid in the genus Euxesta of the family Ulidiidae.
