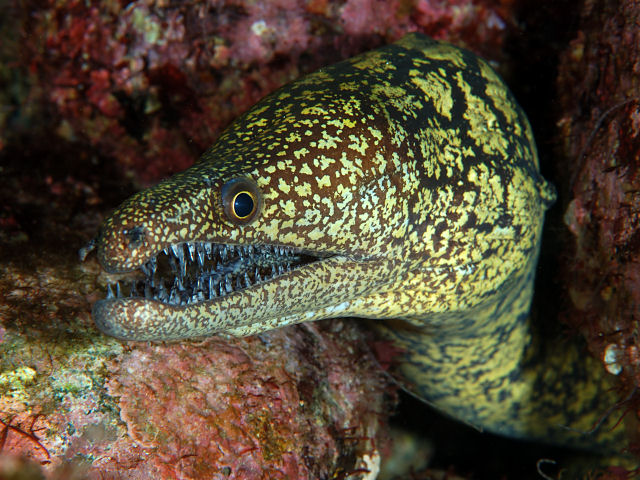

Conservation status
- Least Concern (IUCN 3.1)

Scientific classification
- Kingdom: Animalia
- Phylum: Chordata
- Class: Actinopterygii
- Order: Anguilliformes
- Family: Muraenidae
- Genus: Enchelycore
- Species: E. lichenosa

Binomial name
- Enchelycore lichenosa (D. S. Jordan & Snyder, 1901)

= Enchelycore lichenosa =

Reticulate hookjaw moray

Species of fish

Enchelycore lichenosa is a moray eel found in coral reefs around Taiwan, southern Japan, and the Galapagos Islands. It was first named by Jordan and Snyder in 1901, and is commonly known as the reticulate hookjaw moray. To respirate, the eel constantly opens and closes its mouth.
