= Euxesta thomae =

Scientific classification
- Kingdom: Animalia
- Phylum: Arthropoda
- Clade: Pancrustacea
- Class: Insecta
- Order: Diptera
- Family: Ulidiidae
- Genus: Euxesta
- Species: E. thomae

Binomial name
- Euxesta thomae Loew, 1868

Species of fly

Euxesta thomae is a species of ulidiid or picture-winged fly in the genus Euxesta of the family Ulidiidae.
