= Euxesta intermedia =

Scientific classification
- Kingdom: Animalia
- Phylum: Arthropoda
- Clade: Pancrustacea
- Class: Insecta
- Order: Diptera
- Family: Ulidiidae
- Genus: Euxesta
- Species: E. intermedia

Binomial name
- Euxesta intermedia (Lynch Arribálzaga, 1881)

Synonyms
- Amethysa intermedia

Species of fly

Euxesta intermedia is a species of ulidiidae or picture-winged fly in the genus Euxesta of the family Ulidiidae.
