= Euxesta atlantica =

Scientific classification
- Domain: Eukaryota
- Kingdom: Animalia
- Phylum: Arthropoda
- Class: Insecta
- Order: Diptera
- Family: Ulidiidae
- Genus: Euxesta
- Species: E. atlantica

Binomial name
- Euxesta atlantica Ahlmark, 1995

Species of fly

Euxesta atlantica is a species of ulidiid or picture-winged fly in the genus Euxesta of the family Ulidiidae.
