= Euxesta annonae =

Scientific classification
- Kingdom: Animalia
- Phylum: Arthropoda
- Clade: Pancrustacea
- Class: Insecta
- Order: Diptera
- Family: Ulidiidae
- Genus: Euxesta
- Species: E. annonae

Binomial name
- Euxesta annonae (Fabricius, 1794)

Synonyms
- Amethysa fasciata Macquart, 1835

Species of fly

Euxesta annonae is a species of ulidiid or picture-winged fly in the genus Euxesta of the family Ulidiidae. The species can be found from Orlando, Florida to Hawaii, where it feeds on corn.
