= Euxesta avala =

Scientific classification
- Kingdom: Animalia
- Phylum: Arthropoda
- Class: Insecta
- Order: Diptera
- Family: Ulidiidae
- Genus: Euxesta
- Species: E. avala

Binomial name
- Euxesta avala (Walker, 1849)

Species of fly

Euxesta avala is a species of fly in the genus Euxesta of the family Ulidiidae. Originally named Trypeta avala by Francis Walker in 1849, it was later completely revised as a species of Euxesta.
