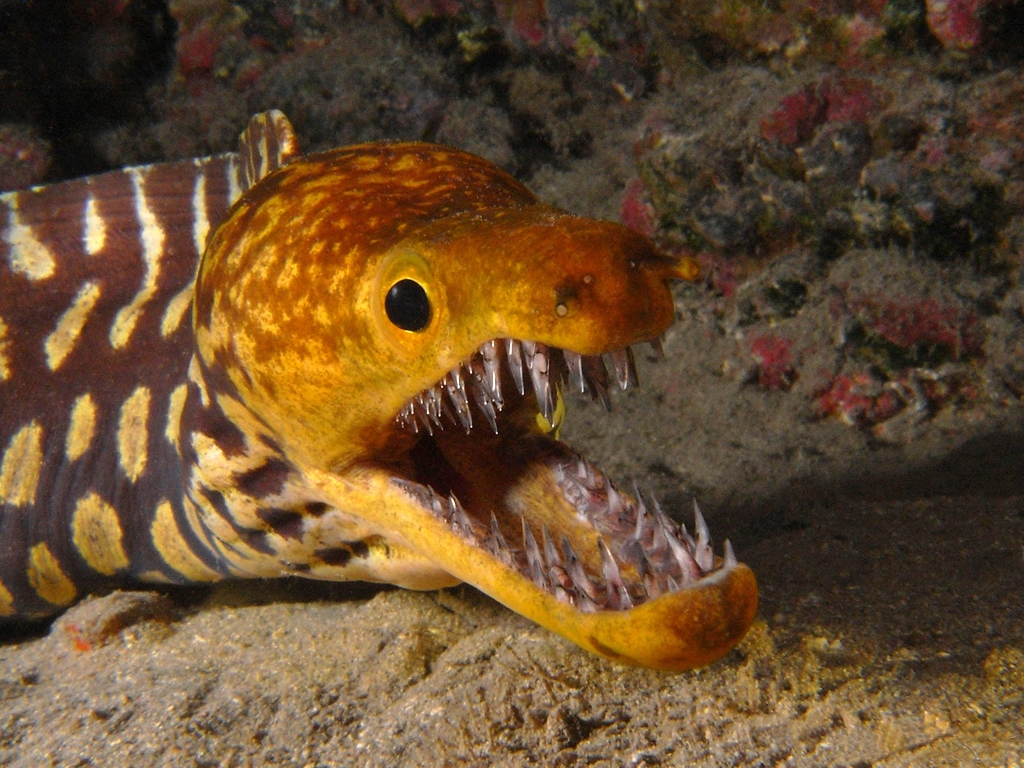

Conservation status
- Least Concern (IUCN 3.1)

Scientific classification
- Kingdom: Animalia
- Phylum: Chordata
- Class: Actinopterygii
- Order: Anguilliformes
- Family: Muraenidae
- Genus: Enchelycore
- Species: E. anatina

Binomial name
- Enchelycore anatina (R. T. Lowe, 1838)

Synonyms
- Muraena anatina Lowe, 1838; Gymnothorax anatinus (Lowe, 1838); Lycodontis anatinus (Lowe, 1838); Muraena sanctaehelenae Günther, 1870

= Fangtooth moray =

Species of fish

The fangtooth moray (Enchelycore anatina), sometimes also known as the tiger moray or bird-eye conger, is a moray eel of the family Muraenidae found in warmer parts of the eastern Atlantic Ocean, including the Canary Islands, Madeira and various other islands. It entered the Mediterranean Sea from the Atlantic and is now found occasionally in the eastern Basin, from Levantine waters and off Turkey, Greece, Croatia and Sicily.

== Description ==
The fangtooth moray is distinctive for its bright yellow head with elongated jaws, which are filled with a large number of long "glasslike" teeth. The body is moderate to dark brown in color with pale spots on the body and fins. The dorsal and anal fins are fused with the caudal and covered with thick skin. The dorsal fin originates on the head above or slightly in front of the gill openings. The pectoral and ventral fins are absent. It can reach up to 120 cm (47 in) in length. The fangtooth moray is a demersal species, inhabiting rocky bottoms rich in crevices. The moray eels are nocturnal carnivores mainly feeding on benthic fish, cephalopods and crustaceans.
