= Euxesta eluta =

Scientific classification
- Domain: Eukaryota
- Kingdom: Animalia
- Phylum: Arthropoda
- Class: Insecta
- Order: Diptera
- Family: Ulidiidae
- Genus: Euxesta
- Species: E. eluta

Binomial name
- Euxesta eluta Loew, 1868

Species of fly

Euxesta eluta is a species of ulidiid or picture-winged fly in the genus Euxesta of the family Ulidiidae. It was described by Hermann Loew in 1868. It feeds on sweet corn in Santa Fe, Argentina. The species breed from spring to late fall by depositing their eggs in protected corn maizes.
