= Euxesta calligyna =

Scientific classification
- Kingdom: Animalia
- Phylum: Arthropoda
- Clade: Pancrustacea
- Class: Insecta
- Order: Diptera
- Family: Ulidiidae
- Genus: Euxesta
- Species: E. calligyna

Binomial name
- Euxesta calligyna (Bigot, 1857)

Synonyms
- Amethysa calligyna

Species of fly

Euxesta calligyna is a species of ulidiid or picture-winged fly in the genus Euxesta of the family Ulidiidae.
