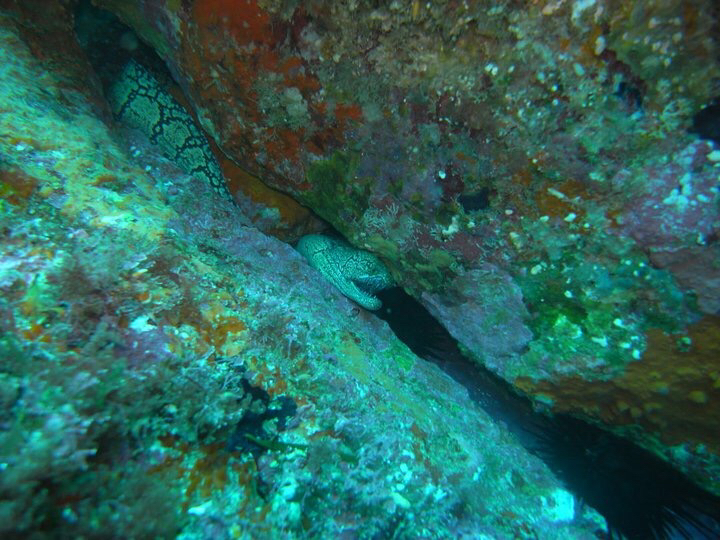

Conservation status
- Least Concern (IUCN 3.1)

Scientific classification
- Kingdom: Animalia
- Phylum: Chordata
- Class: Actinopterygii
- Order: Anguilliformes
- Family: Muraenidae
- Genus: Enchelycore
- Species: E. ramosa

Binomial name
- Enchelycore ramosa (Griffin, 1926)

= Mosaic moray =

Species of fish

The mosaic moray (Enchelycore ramosa) is a moray eel of the genus Enchelycore, found in south-eastern Australia and around the offshore islands off Northland on the North Island of New Zealand at depths down to 100 metres, in reef areas of broken rock. Their length is between 40 and 180 centimetres (up to 6 feet), making them the largest known member of their genus.
