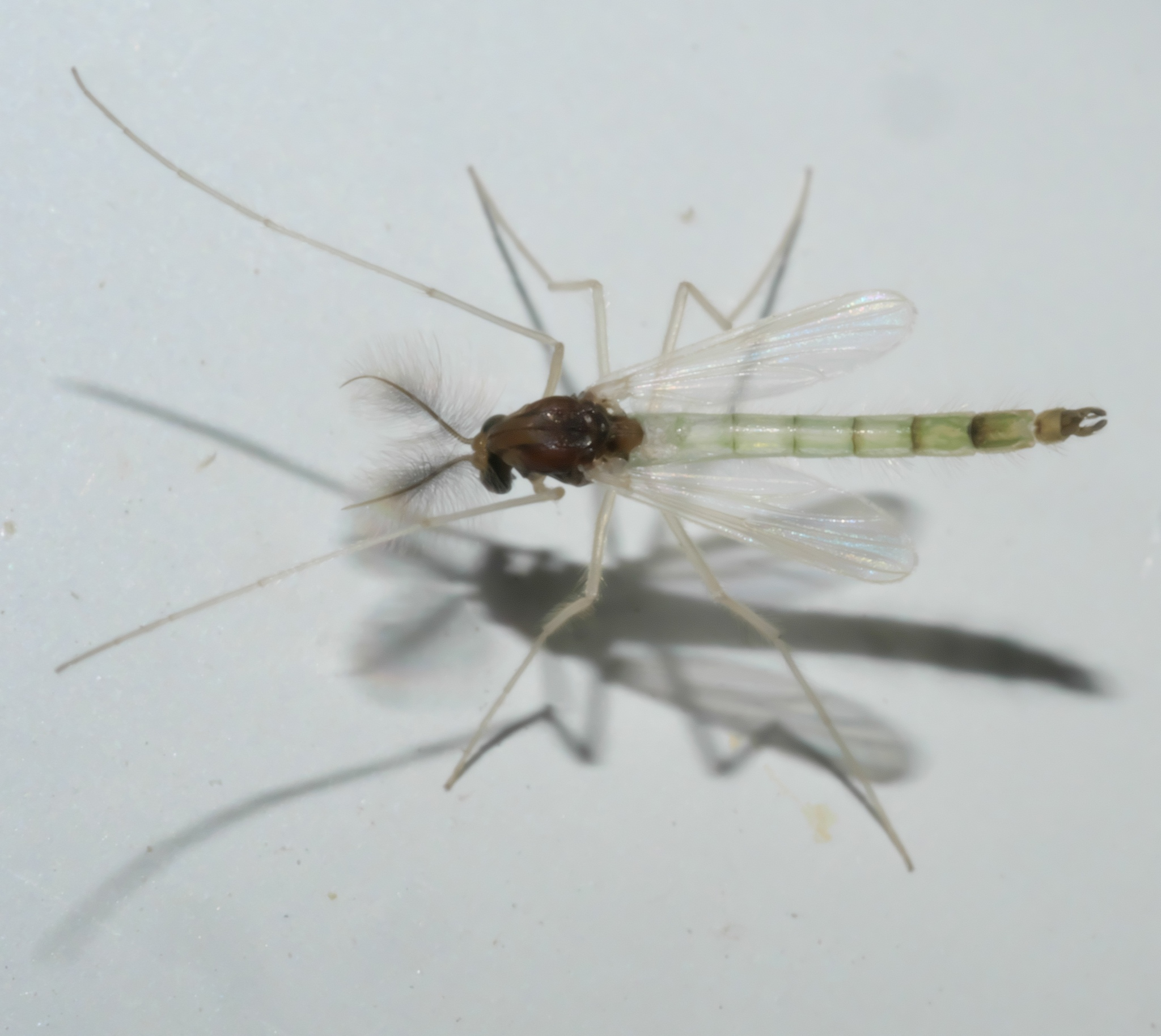
- Endochironomus nigricans, Oklahoma

Scientific classification
- Kingdom: Animalia
- Phylum: Arthropoda
- Clade: Pancrustacea
- Class: Insecta
- Order: Diptera
- Family: Chironomidae
- Subfamily: Chironominae
- Tribe: Chironomini
- Genus: Endochironomus; Kieffer, 1918

Synonyms
- Endochironmus

= Endochironomus =

Genus of non-biting midges

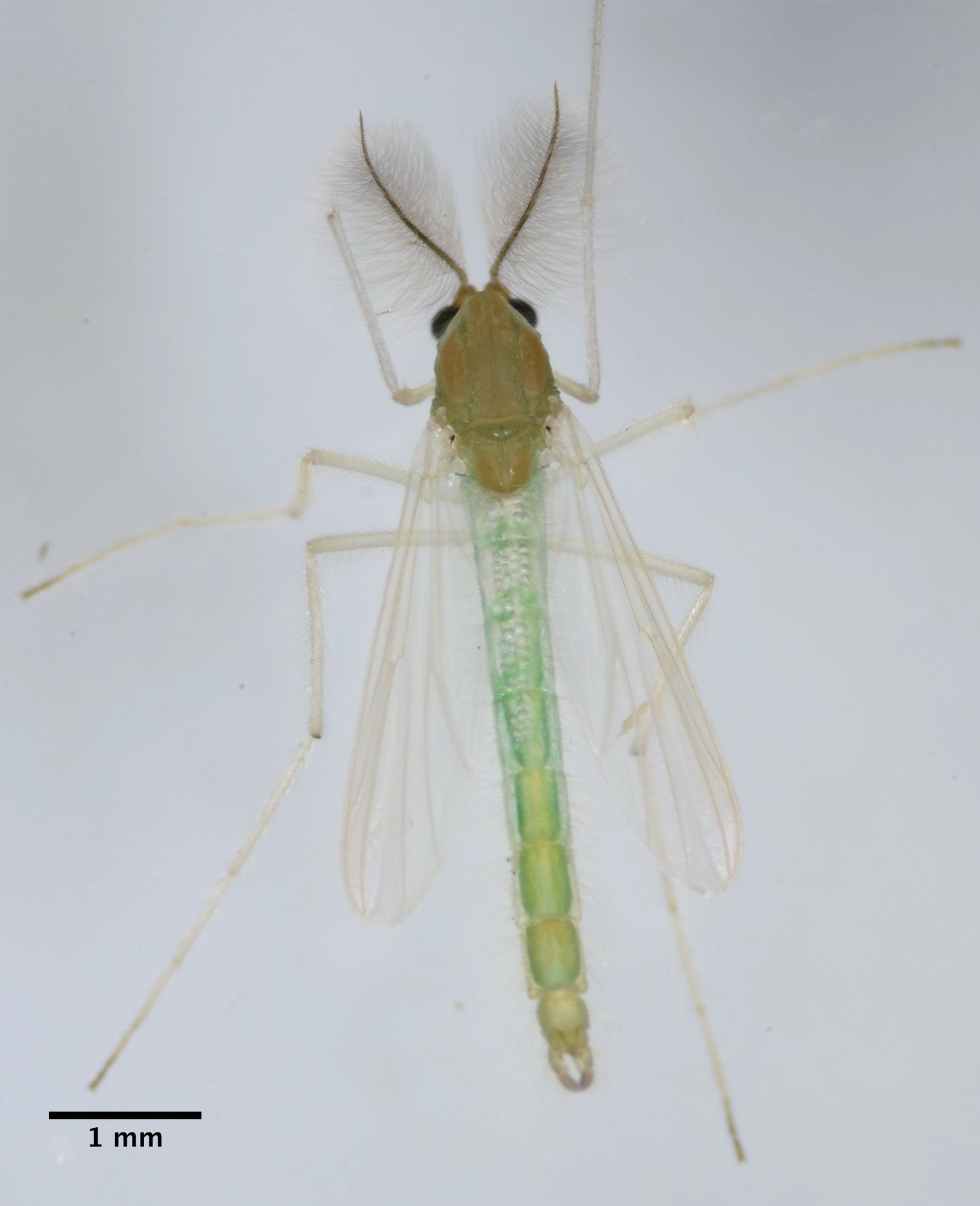
Endochironomus subtendens, California

Endochironomus is a genus of midges in the family Chironomidae. There are more than 30 described species in Endochironomus, found mainly in North America and Europe.

== Species ==
These 33 species belong to the genus Endochironomus:

- Endochironomus abranchius (Kieffer, 1913)
- Endochironomus albipennis (Meigen, 1830)
- Endochironomus alismatis (Keiffer)
- Endochironomus altaicus Kruglova, 1940
- Endochironomus ampliceps Dutta, 1994
- Endochironomus cognatus (Kieffer, 1909)
- Endochironomus dispar (Meigen, 1830)
- Endochironomus disparilis (Goetghebuer, 1936)
- Endochironomus diversicolor Linevich, 1963
- Endochironomus donatoris Shilova, 1974
- Endochironomus effusus Dutta, 1994
- Endochironomus impar (Walker, 1856)
- Endochironomus lepidus (Meigen, 1830)
- Endochironomus leucolabis (Kieffer, 1915)
- Endochironomus longiclava (Kieffer, 1913)
- Endochironomus meinerti (Kieffer, 1918)
- Endochironomus nervicola (Kieffer, 1913)
- Endochironomus nigricans (Johannsen, 1905)
- Endochironomus notabilis (Macquart, 1834)
- Endochironomus nymphaeae (Willem, 1908)
- Endochironomus occultus Kieffer, 1922
- Endochironomus oldenbergi Goetghebuer, 1932
- Endochironomus palauensis (Tokunaga, 1964)
- Endochironomus parvulus Kieffer, 1924
- Endochironomus pekanus (Kieffer, 1916)
- Endochironomus scripicola (Kieffer, 1913)
- Endochironomus signaticornis (Kieffer, 1913)
- Endochironomus stackelbergi Goetghebuer, 1935
- Endochironomus subtendens (Townes, 1945)
- Endochironomus tendens (Fabricius, 1775)
- Endochironomus tenuicaudus (Tokunaga, 1964)
- Endochironomus uresipallidulus Sasa, 1989
- † Endochironomus eocenicus Doitteau & Nel, 2007
