= Euxesta tepocae =

Scientific classification
- Kingdom: Animalia
- Phylum: Arthropoda
- Clade: Pancrustacea
- Class: Insecta
- Order: Diptera
- Family: Ulidiidae
- Genus: Acrosticta
- Species: A. tepocae

Binomial name
- Acrosticta tepocae Cole, 1923

Species of fly

Acrosticta tepocae is a species of ulidiid or picture-winged fly in the genus Acrosticta of the family Ulidiidae.
