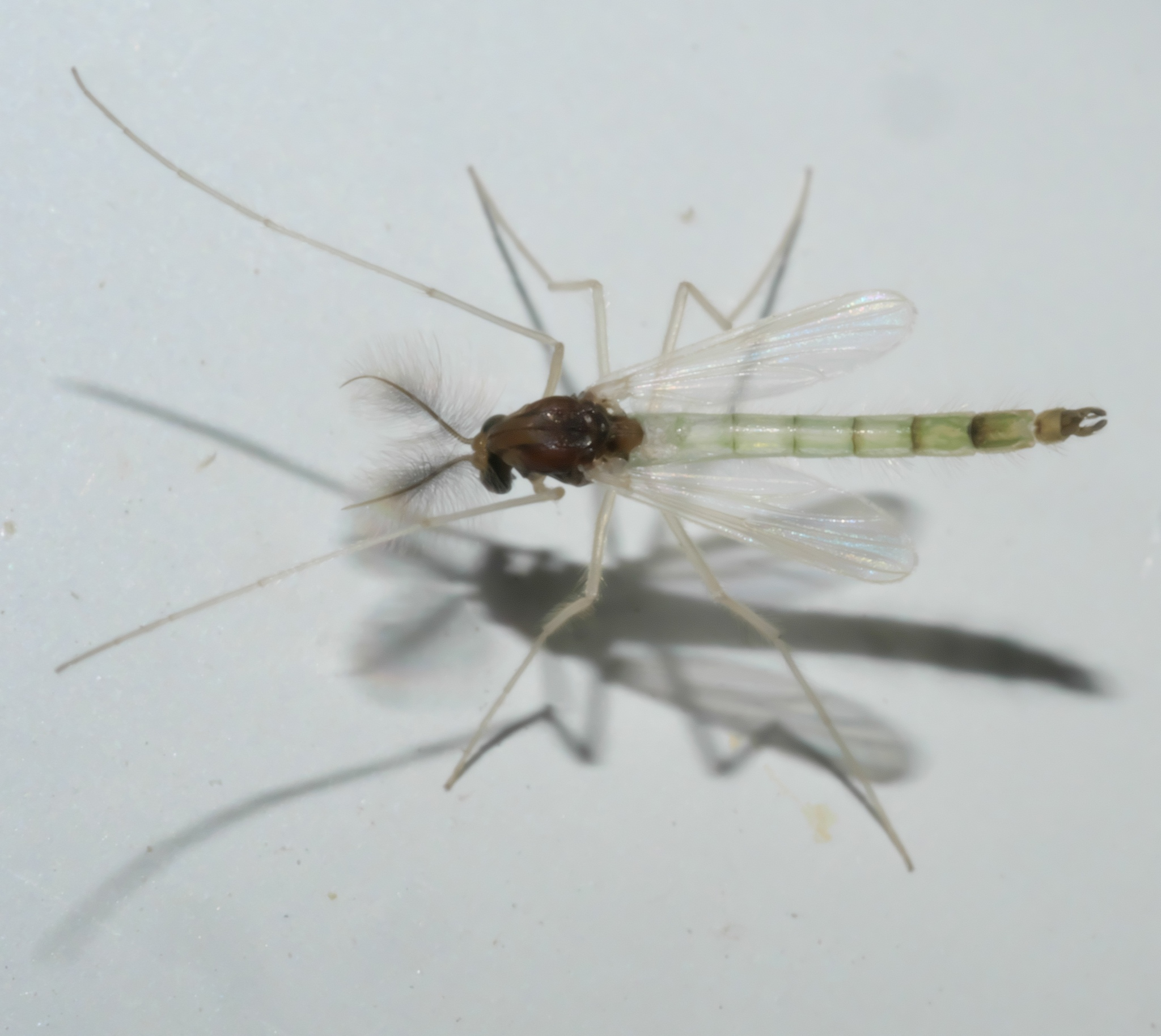
- Endochironomus nigricans, Oklahoma

Scientific classification
- Domain: Eukaryota
- Kingdom: Animalia
- Phylum: Arthropoda
- Class: Insecta
- Order: Diptera
- Family: Chironomidae
- Subfamily: Chironominae
- Tribe: Chironomini
- Genus: Endochironomus
- Species: E. nigricans

Binomial name
- Endochironomus nigricans (Johannsen, 1905)

Synonyms
- Chironomus johnsoni Kieffer, 1906; Chironomus nigricans Johannsen, 1905

= Endochironomus nigricans =

Species of fly

Endochironomus nigricans is a species of midge in the family Chironomidae, found primarily in North America.
