= Euxesta nigricans =

Scientific classification
- Domain: Eukaryota
- Kingdom: Animalia
- Phylum: Arthropoda
- Class: Insecta
- Order: Diptera
- Family: Ulidiidae
- Genus: Euxesta
- Species: E. nigricans

Binomial name
- Euxesta nigricans Wulp, 1899

Species of fly

Euxesta nigricans is a species of ulidiid or picture-winged fly in the genus Euxesta of the family Ulidiidae. It was described by Frederik Maurits van der Wulp in 1899. It can be found in Guerrero, Mexico.

== History of discovery ==
The species Euxesta nigricans was first formally described in 1899 by the Dutch entomologist Frederik Maurits van der Wulp, a renowned dipterist of the late 19th century. Van der Wulp’s original description established the species within the genus Euxesta, contributing significantly to the early taxonomic framework of ulidiid (picture-winged) flies.

Decades later, E. nigricans was recognized and reaffirmed by entomologists studying the taxonomy of Euxesta. In 1995, George C. Steyskal and Kurt M. Ahlmark published a revision that included E. nigricans in a key to this subgroup, further confirming its morphological distinctness relative to other species such as E. calligyna and E. quaternaria.

Since its original description, Euxesta nigricans has been recorded with a geographic distribution primarily in Guerrero, Mexico, based on collection data aggregated in global biodiversity databases.
