= Mottled conger moray =

Conservation status
- Least Concern (IUCN 3.1)

Scientific classification
- Kingdom: Animalia
- Phylum: Chordata
- Class: Actinopterygii
- Division: Teleostei
- Order: Anguilliformes
- Family: Muraenidae
- Genus: Enchelycore
- Species: E. nigricans

Binomial name
- Enchelycore nigricans (Bonnaterre, 1788)

Species of fish

The mottled conger moray, sometimes called mulatto conger or viper moray, is a moray eel of the genus Enchelycore, distributed across the Atlantic Ocean. Its length is up to 100 centimeters.
