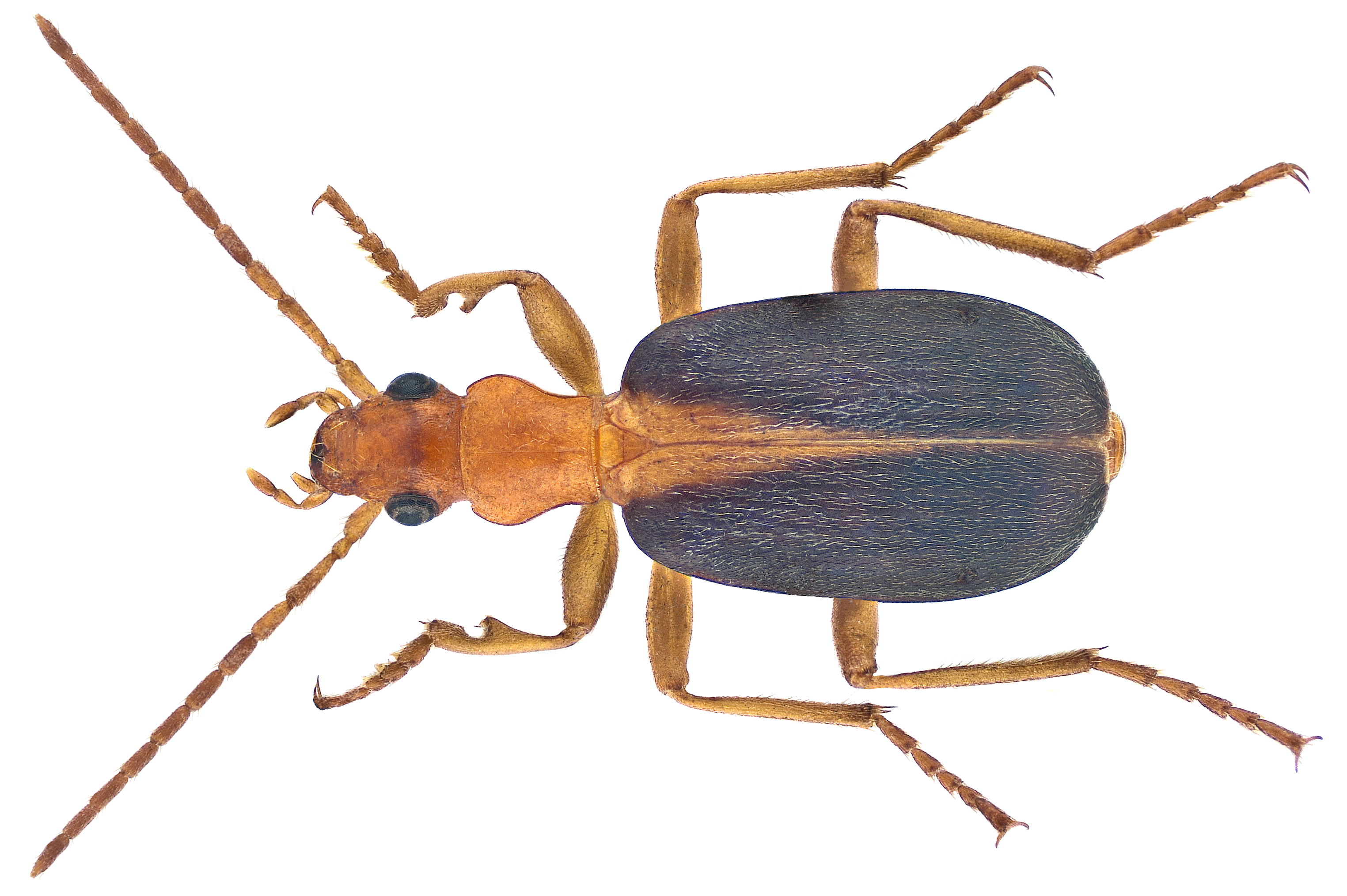

Scientific classification
- Kingdom: Animalia
- Phylum: Arthropoda
- Clade: Pancrustacea
- Class: Insecta
- Order: Coleoptera
- Suborder: Adephaga
- Family: Carabidae
- Genus: Brachinus
- Species: B. plagiatus

Binomial name
- Brachinus plagiatus Reiche, 1868

Synonyms
- Brachinus bombarda Latreille & Dejean, 1824 [nec Illiger, 1800]

= Brachinus plagiatus =

Species of beetle

Brachinus plagiatus is a species of ground beetle from the Brachininae subfamily that can be found in Albania, Bulgaria, France, Greece, Hungary, Italy, Moldova, Slovakia, the southern part of Russia, all states of former Yugoslavia (except for North Macedonia), and in Western Europe. It can also be found on some islands such as the Balearic Islands, Corsica, Sardinia and Sicily. In Asia, it can be found on Cyprus, in Iraq and Syria. It can also be found in North African countries such as Algeria, Morocco and Tunisia. They were also found and described in Georgia in 2004. The species is identical in colour to the following species from the same genera: Brachinus crepitans, Brachinus efflans, and Brachinus ejaculans.
