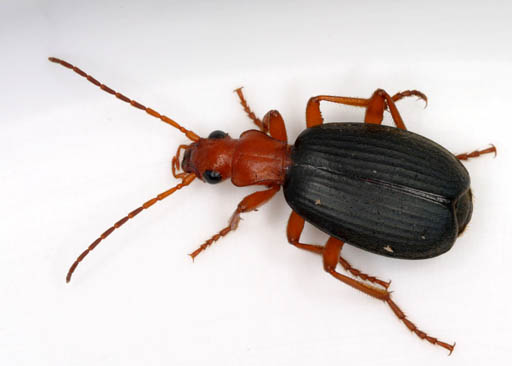
- Brachinus sp.

Scientific classification
- Kingdom: Animalia
- Phylum: Arthropoda
- Clade: Pancrustacea
- Class: Insecta
- Order: Coleoptera
- Suborder: Adephaga
- Family: Carabidae
- Tribe: Brachinini
- Genus: Brachinus; Weber, 1801

= Brachinus =

Genus of beetles

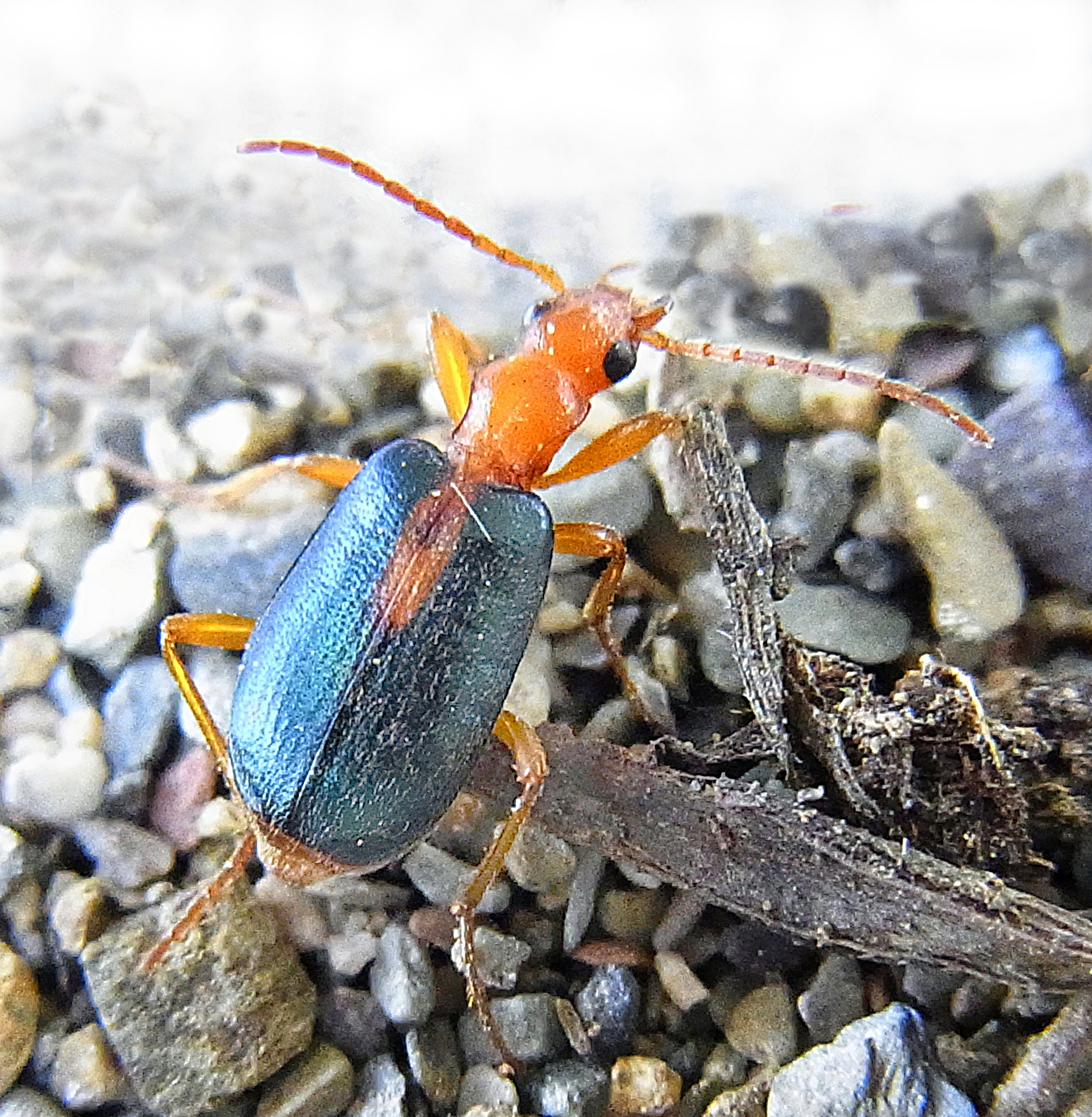
Brachinus sclopeta

Brachinus is a genus of ground beetle native to the Nearctic, Palearctic, the Near East and North Africa. Beetles in this genus are commonly referred to as bombardier beetles. The genus contains the following species:

- Brachinus aabaaba Erwin, 1970
- Brachinus abbreviatus (Laporte, 1835)
- Brachinus abyssinicus Chaudoir, 1876
- Brachinus adustipennis Erwin, 1969
- Brachinus aeger Chaudoir, 1876
- Brachinus aeneicostis Bates, 1883
- Brachinus afghanus Jedlicka, 1967
- Brachinus agraphus (Alluaud, 1899)
- Brachinus albarracinus Wagner, 1926
- Brachinus alexandri F.Battoni, 1984
- Brachinus alexiguus Erwin, 1970
- Brachinus algoensis Péringuey, 1896
- Brachinus alternans Dejean, 1825
- Brachinus americanus (LeConte, 1844)
- Brachinus andalusiacus Rambur, 1837
- Brachinus andamanensis Tian & Deuve, 2015
- Brachinus andreaei Basilewsky, 1964
- Brachinus angustatus (Dejean, 1831)
- Brachinus ankarensis Jedlicka, 1962
- Brachinus annulicornis Chaudoir, 1842
- Brachinus apicalis Erichson, 1843
- Brachinus arboreus Chevrolat, 1834
- Brachinus aristokrates Liebke, 1934
- Brachinus armiger Dejean, 1831
- Brachinus atramentarius Mannerheim, 1837
- Brachinus atripensis Ballion, 1871
- Brachinus azureipennis Chaudoir, 1876
- Brachinus bagdatensis Pic, 1902
- Brachinus bantimurungensis Kirschenhofer, 2012
- Brachinus barbarus Lucas, 1846
- Brachinus barclayi Hrdlicka, 2019
- Brachinus barthei Mateu, 1958
- Brachinus batuensis Kirschenhofer, 2011
- Brachinus bayardi Dejean, 1831
- Brachinus bellicosus L.Dufour, 1820
- Brachinus belyaevae Fedorenko, 2013
- Brachinus bendanilloi Lassalle & Schnell, 2018
- Brachinus berytensis Reiche & Saulcy, 1855
- Brachinus bigutticeps Chaudoir, 1876
- Brachinus bilineatus Laporte, 1835
- Brachinus bipustulatus Quensel, 1806
- Brachinus bodemeyeri Apfelbeck, 1904
- Brachinus boeticus Rambur, 1837
- Brachinus bolovenensis Hrdlicka, 2009
- Brachinus brevicollis Motschulsky, 1844
- Brachinus brittoni Ali, 1967
- Brachinus bruchi Liebke, 1939
- Brachinus brunneus Laporte, 1834
- Brachinus caffer Boheman, 1848
- Brachinus cambodgensis Kirschenhofer, 2012
- Brachinus canaliculatus Fairmaire, 1897
- Brachinus capnicus Erwin, 1970
- Brachinus catalonicus Jeanne, 1988
- Brachinus chalchihuitlicue Erwin, 1970
- Brachinus charis Andrewes, 1923
- Brachinus chaudoirianus Jakobson, 1908
- Brachinus chinensis Chaudoir, 1850
- Brachinus chirriador Erwin, 1970
- Brachinus cibolensis Erwin, 1970
- Brachinus ciliatus Liebke, 1933
- Brachinus cinctellus Chaudoir, 1876
- Brachinus cinctipennis Chevrolat, 1835
- Brachinus circumtinctus Bates, 1892
- Brachinus collarti Basilewsky, 1948
- Brachinus conformis Dejean, 1831
- Brachinus congicus (Basilewsky, 1958)
- Brachinus connectoides (Jeannel, 1949)
- Brachinus connectus Dejean, 1831
- Brachinus consanguineus Chaudoir, 1876
- Brachinus constrictus Reitter, 1919
- Brachinus cordicollis Dejean, 1826
- Brachinus costatulus Motschulsky, 1844
- Brachinus costiger Chaudoir, 1876
- Brachinus costipennis Motschulsky, 1859
- Brachinus costulipennis Liebke, 1928
- Brachinus crepitans (Linnaeus, 1758) (Bombardier Beetle)
- Brachinus cruciatus (Quensel, 1806)
- Brachinus cyanipennis Say, 1823
- Brachinus cyanochroaticus Erwin, 1969
- Brachinus cychroides Hrdlicka, 2009
- Brachinus dalatensis Fedorenko, 2013
- Brachinus daliensis Kirschenhofer, 2011
- Brachinus dawnaensis Kirschenhofer, 2003
- Brachinus demoulini Basilewsky, 1962
- Brachinus deuvei Gao & Tian, 2011
- Brachinus devagiriensis Akhil; Divya & Sabu, 2020
- Brachinus dieganus (Jeannel, 1949)
- Brachinus diffusus Chaudoir, 1876
- Brachinus dilapsus Antoine, 1941
- Brachinus dilatatus Klug, 1832
- Brachinus dilatipennis Reitter, 1919
- Brachinus dilottii Maran, 1933
- Brachinus dissimilis (Basilewsky, 1943)
- Brachinus distans Lorenz, 1998
- Brachinus dorsalis Dejean, 1831
- Brachinus drumonti Tian & Deuve, 2015
- Brachinus dryas Andrewes, 1936
- Brachinus efflans Dejean, 1830
- Brachinus ejaculans Fischer von Waldheim, 1828
- Brachinus elegans Chaudoir, 1842
- Brachinus elegantulus Erichson, 1842
- Brachinus elongatulus Chaudoir, 1876
- Brachinus enonensis Péringuey, 1898
- Brachinus eucosmus Andrewes, 1937
- Brachinus evanescens Bates, 1892
- Brachinus exhalans (P.Rossi, 1792)
- Brachinus explodens Duftschmid, 1812
- Brachinus explosus Erwin, 1970
- Brachinus exquisitus Bates, 1892
- Brachinus fageli Basilewsky, 1962
- Brachinus fasciatocollis (Fairmaire, 1901)
- Brachinus favicollis Erwin, 1965
- Brachinus flavicapillus Bates, 1892
- Brachinus flavipes Gao & Tian, 2011
- Brachinus flavithorax Tian & Deuve, 2015
- Brachinus flaviventris Chaudoir, 1876
- Brachinus flavus Jedlicka, 1955
- Brachinus flores Kirschenhofer, 2011
- Brachinus floresensis Hrdlicka, 2017
- Brachinus foochowi Kirschenhofer, 1986
- Brachinus formosanus Jedlicka, 1939
- Brachinus forticostis Liebke, 1934
- Brachinus frontalis Chaudoir, 1883
- Brachinus fukienensis Hrdlicka, 2009
- Brachinus fulminatus Erwin, 1969
- Brachinus fulvipennis Chaudoir, 1876
- Brachinus fumans (Fabricius, 1781)
- Brachinus fuscicornis Dejean, 1826
- Brachinus fuscipennis Dejean, 1825
- Brachinus galactoderus Erwin, 1970
- Brachinus garnerae Hrdlicka, 2019
- Brachinus gebhardis Erwin, 1965
- Brachinus geiseri Hrdlicka, 2019
- Brachinus genicularis Mannerheim, 1837
- Brachinus geniculatus Dejean, 1831
- Brachinus gentilis Erichson, 1843
- Brachinus ghindanus Liebke, 1934
- Brachinus grandis Brullé, 1838
- Brachinus grootaerti Tian & Deuve, 2013
- Brachinus guangdongensis Tian & Deuve, 2015
- Brachinus hajeki Hrdlicka, 2017
- Brachinus hamatus Fischer von Waldheim, 1828
- Brachinus havai Hrdlicka, 2016
- Brachinus hazardi Andrewes, 1930
- Brachinus hexagrammus Chaudoir, 1876
- Brachinus hirsutus Bates, 1884
- Brachinus hoffmanni Liebke, 1927
- Brachinus hubeiensis Hrdlicka, 2009
- Brachinus humeralis Ahrens, 1812
- Brachinus hunanensis Kirschenhofer, 2011
- Brachinus hylaenus Reichardt, 1967
- Brachinus ichabodopsis Erwin, 1970
- Brachinus illotus Chaudoir, 1876
- Brachinus immaculicornis Dejean, 1826
- Brachinus immarginatus Brullé, 1838
- Brachinus imperialensis Erwin, 1965
- Brachinus imporcitis Erwin, 1970
- Brachinus incomptus Bates, 1873
- Brachinus inconditus Péringuey, 1896
- Brachinus inops Andrewes, 1932
- Brachinus intactus Bates, 1892
- Brachinus intermedius Brullé, 1838
- Brachinus irakus Liebke, 1933
- Brachinus italicus (Dejean, 1831)
- Brachinus jakli Hrdlicka, 2009
- Brachinus janthinipennis (Dejean, 1831)
- Brachinus javalinopsis Erwin, 1970
- Brachinus johorensis Kirschenhofer, 2012
- Brachinus jucundus Dejean, 1831
- Brachinus kalalovae Roubal, 1932
- Brachinus kansanus LeConte, 1863
- Brachinus kavanaughi Erwin, 1969
- Brachinus knirschi Jedlicka, 1931
- Brachinus kollari Liebke, 1934
- Brachinus krynickii Hrdlicka in Löbl & Smetana, 2003
- Brachinus kryzhanovskii Belousov & Kabak, 1992
- Brachinus laetus Dejean, 1831
- Brachinus laevicostis Liebke, 1934
- Brachinus langenhani Liebke, 1934
- Brachinus lapidarius Basilewsky, 1962
- Brachinus lateralis Dejean, 1831
- Brachinus latipennis Peyerimhoff, 1907
- Brachinus latus Lorenz, 1998
- Brachinus lavaudeni (Jeannel, 1949)
- Brachinus leprieuri Gory, 1833
- Brachinus lesnei Andrewes, 1923
- Brachinus lethierryi Reiche, 1868
- Brachinus lewecki Liebke, 1928
- Brachinus lewisii Bates, 1873
- Brachinus leytensis Lassalle & Schnell, 2018
- Brachinus limbellus Chaudoir, 1876
- Brachinus limbicollis Chaudoir, 1876
- Brachinus limbiger Chaudoir, 1876
- Brachinus lombokensis Kirschenhofer, 2010
- Brachinus longipalpis Wiedemann, 1821
- Brachinus longulus Chaudoir, 1876
- Brachinus luzonicus Chaudoir, 1876
- Brachinus macrocerus Chaudoir, 1876
- Brachinus mactus Péringuey, 1904
- Brachinus madecassus (Jeannel, 1949)
- Brachinus magyari Jedlicka, 1960
- Brachinus mansorii Azadbakhsh & Kirschenhofer, 2018
- Brachinus marginellus Dejean, 1826
- Brachinus marginiventris Brullé, 1838
- Brachinus marleyi Barker, 1919
- Brachinus mauretanicus Bedel, 1914
- Brachinus medius T.W.Harris, 1828
- Brachinus melanarthrus Chaudoir, 1876
- Brachinus melancholicus Schmidt-Goebel, 1846
- Brachinus meratusensis Hrdlicka, 2017
- Brachinus merkli Kirschenhofer, 2003
- Brachinus mesopotamicus Ali, 1967
- Brachinus methneri Liebke, 1934
- Brachinus mexicanus Dejean, 1831
- Brachinus micheli (Jeannel, 1949)
- Brachinus microamericanus Erwin, 1969
- Brachinus microrrhabdus (Alluaud, 1899)
- Brachinus midoli Alluaud, 1917
- Brachinus mindanaoensis Tian & Deuve, 2013
- Brachinus minor Jedlicka, 1958
- Brachinus mobilis Erwin, 1970
- Brachinus modestus Schmidt-Goebel, 1846
- Brachinus motschulskyi Hrdlicka in Löbl & Smetana, 2003
- Brachinus muchei Jedlicka, 1967
- Brachinus natalicus Péringuey, 1896
- Brachinus neglectus LeConte, 1844
- Brachinus ngoclinhensis Hrdlicka, 2017
- Brachinus niger Chaudoir, 1876
- Brachinus nigricans Chaudoir, 1850
- Brachinus nigricornis Gebler, 1830
- Brachinus nigridorsis Nakane, 1962
- Brachinus nigripes G.R.Waterhouse, 1841
- Brachinus nigrovirescens Basilewsky, 1951
- Brachinus nobilis Dejean, 1831
- Brachinus nuristanus Jedlicka, 1967
- Brachinus oaxacensis Erwin, 1970
- Brachinus obliquetruncatus Perris, 1875
- Brachinus obliterus Péringuey, 1896
- Brachinus oblongus Dejean, 1825
- Brachinus obtusus (Thunberg, 1784)
- Brachinus olgae Arribas, 1993
- Brachinus olidus Reiche, 1843
- Brachinus oneili Péringuey, 1898
- Brachinus opacipennis Motschulsky, 1864
- Brachinus orestes Kirschenhofer, 2003
- Brachinus orientalis Chaudoir, 1876
- Brachinus ornatus Fairmaire, 1901
- Brachinus otini Antoine, 1963
- Brachinus ovalipennis Fedorenko, 2013
- Brachinus ovipennis LeConte, 1863
- Brachinus oxygonus Chaudoir, 1843
- Brachinus pachygaster Perty, 1830
- Brachinus palawanensis Tian & Deuve, 2013
- Brachinus pallidipes Reitter, 1919
- Brachinus pallidus Erwin, 1965
- Brachinus pallipes Dejean, 1826
- Brachinus papua Darlington, 1968
- Brachinus pateri Puel, 1938
- Brachinus patruelis LeConte, 1844
- Brachinus paviei Lesne, 1896
- Brachinus pecoudi Puel, 1925
- Brachinus pectoralis Dejean, 1825
- Brachinus pelengensis Hrdlicka, 2009
- Brachinus peltastes Andrewes, 1931
- Brachinus perplexus Dejean, 1831
- Brachinus perrieri (Jeannel, 1949)
- Brachinus phaeocerus Chaudoir, 1868
- Brachinus philippinensis Tian & Deuve, 2007
- Brachinus piceus Chaudoir, 1876
- Brachinus pictus (Hope, 1833)
- Brachinus plagiatus Reiche, 1868
- Brachinus pokharaensis Kirschenhofer, 2012
- Brachinus posticus Dejean, 1831
- Brachinus praestans Andrewes, 1931
- Brachinus promontorii Péringuey, 1888
- Brachinus proximus Fairmaire, 1887
- Brachinus pseudocruciatus Reitter, 1909
- Brachinus psophia Audinet-Serville, 1821
- Brachinus puberulus Chaudoir, 1868
- Brachinus punctaticollis Heller, 1923
- Brachinus puncticollis Schmidt-Goebel, 1846
- Brachinus pygmaeus (Dejean, 1826)
- Brachinus quadriguttatus Gebler, 1830
- Brachinus quadripennis Dejean, 1825
- Brachinus reyi Andrewes, 1924
- Brachinus rikatlae Péringuey, 1896
- Brachinus rugipennis Chaudoir, 1868
- Brachinus sallei Chaudoir, 1876
- Brachinus sanchi Azadbakhsh & Kirschenhofer, 2018
- Brachinus schmidti Andrewes, 1927
- Brachinus scitulus Schmidt-Goebel, 1846
- Brachinus sclopeta (Fabricius, 1792)
- Brachinus scotomedes L.Redtenbacher, 1868
- Brachinus scotti Liebke, 1934
- Brachinus scriptus Chaudoir, 1878
- Brachinus scutellatus Chaudoir, 1876
- Brachinus sericeus Dejean, 1831
- Brachinus servillei Marc, 1839
- Brachinus sexmaculatus Dejean, 1825
- Brachinus sexnotatus Liebke, 1934
- Brachinus sexpustulatus (Fabricius, 1775)
- Brachinus seyrigi (Alluaud, 1935)
- Brachinus sicardi Jeannel, 1949
- Brachinus sichemita Reiche & Saulcy, 1855
- Brachinus simulans Péringuey, 1896
- Brachinus solidipalpis Tian & Deuve, 2007
- Brachinus solidus Péringuey, 1898
- Brachinus somereni Burgeon, 1947
- Brachinus sonorous Erwin, 1970
- Brachinus sordidus Andrewes, 1933
- Brachinus stappersi Liebke, 1934
- Brachinus stenoderus Bates, 1873
- Brachinus stevensi Andrewes, 1924
- Brachinus stevensianus Jedlicka, 1956
- Brachinus stygius Andrewes, 1933
- Brachinus subcostatus Dejean, 1825
- Brachinus suberbianus Alluaud, 1935
- Brachinus sublaevis Chaudoir, 1868
- Brachinus subnotatus Chaudoir, 1844
- Brachinus suensoni Kirschenhofer, 1986
- Brachinus sulcipennis (Jeannel, 1949)
- Brachinus sumbawanus Hrdlicka, 2017
- Brachinus suturalis (Jeannel, 1949)
- Brachinus suturatus Chaudoir, 1876
- Brachinus suturellus Chaudoir, 1876
- Brachinus szetschuanensis Jedlicka, 1964
- Brachinus talyschensis Motschulsky, 1850
- Brachinus tenuicollis LeConte, 1844
- Brachinus tenuis Lorenz, 1998
- Brachinus testaceus Rambur, 1837
- Brachinus tetracolon Chaudoir, 1876
- Brachinus tetragrammus Chaudoir, 1876
- Brachinus tetraspilotus Chaudoir, 1876
- Brachinus tetrastigma Fairmaire, 1897
- Brachinus texanus Chaudoir, 1868
- Brachinus tianshanicus Mikhailov, 1976
- Brachinus tigridis Ali, 1967
- Brachinus timorensis Hrdlicka, 2017
- Brachinus truncatulus Fairmaire, 1901
- Brachinus tsara Alluaud, 1918
- Brachinus turkestanicus Liebke, 1928
- Brachinus turnai Hrdlicka, 2009
- Brachinus vadoni Jeannel, 1949
- Brachinus vagus Péringuey, 1898
- Brachinus variegatus (Roth, 1851)
- Brachinus variventris L.Schaufuss, 1862
- Brachinus velutinus Erwin, 1965
- Brachinus vicinus Dejean, 1826
- Brachinus vigilans Chaudoir, 1876
- Brachinus viridipennis Dejean, 1831
- Brachinus vitticollis Chaudoir, 1876
- Brachinus votrubai Hrdlicka, 2009
- Brachinus vulcanoides Erwin, 1969
- Brachinus xanthophryus Chaudoir, 1876
- Brachinus xanthopleurus Chaudoir, 1876
- Brachinus yunnanus Jedlicka, 1964
- † Brachinus newberryi Scudder, 1900
- † Brachinus primordialis Heer, 1847
- † Brachinus repressus Scudder, 1900
