= Brachinus patruelis =

Scientific classification
- Kingdom: Animalia
- Phylum: Arthropoda
- Clade: Pancrustacea
- Class: Insecta
- Order: Coleoptera
- Suborder: Adephaga
- Family: Carabidae
- Genus: Brachinus
- Species: B. patruelis

Binomial name
- Brachinus patruelis LeConte, 1844

Species of beetle

Brachinus patruelis is a species of bombardier beetle in the ground beetle subfamily Brachininae. It is endemic to the Northeastern United States.

Brachinus patruelis are small beetles measuring 5.7–8.3 mm (0.22–0.33 in). They are probably flightless.
