= Brachinus psophia =

Scientific classification
- Kingdom: Animalia
- Phylum: Arthropoda
- Clade: Pancrustacea
- Class: Insecta
- Order: Coleoptera
- Suborder: Adephaga
- Family: Carabidae
- Genus: Brachinus
- Species: B. psophia

Binomial name
- Brachinus psophia Audinet-Serville, 1821

Species of beetle

Brachinus psophia is a species of ground beetle from the subfamily Brachininae. It is widely distributed in the southern half of Europe (including Bulgaria, Greece, Italy, Romania, Albania, Austria, Czech Republic, France, Hungary, Moldova, Slovakia, Ukraine, all states of former Yugoslavia (except for North Macedonia), and in Western Europe). It can also be found on such European islands as Corsica, Sardinia and Sicily, and on the island of Cyprus in Asia. Besides European countries it can be found in Armenia, Iran, Iraq and Central Asian republics. It is also known from Turkey, The species was also found and described in Georgia in 2004. and

== Conservation ==
The species is considered "endangered" in the Czech Republic.
