= Brachinus fumans =

Scientific classification
- Kingdom: Animalia
- Phylum: Arthropoda
- Clade: Pancrustacea
- Class: Insecta
- Order: Coleoptera
- Suborder: Adephaga
- Family: Carabidae
- Genus: Brachinus
- Species: B. fumans

Binomial name
- Brachinus fumans (Fabricius, 1781)

Species of beetle

Brachinus fumans, the American bombardier beetle, is a species of ground beetle in the family Carabidae. It is found in North America.
