= Brachinus mexicanus =

Scientific classification
- Kingdom: Animalia
- Phylum: Arthropoda
- Clade: Pancrustacea
- Class: Insecta
- Order: Coleoptera
- Suborder: Adephaga
- Family: Carabidae
- Genus: Brachinus
- Species: B. mexicanus

Binomial name
- Brachinus mexicanus Dejean, 1831

Species of beetle

Brachinus mexicanus is a species of ground beetle in the family Carabidae. It is found in Central America and North America.
