= Brachinus elongatulus =

Scientific classification
- Kingdom: Animalia
- Phylum: Arthropoda
- Clade: Pancrustacea
- Class: Insecta
- Order: Coleoptera
- Suborder: Adephaga
- Family: Carabidae
- Genus: Brachinus
- Species: B. elongatulus

Binomial name
- Brachinus elongatulus Chaudoir, 1876

Species of beetle

Brachinus elongatulus is a species of ground beetle in the family Carabidae. It is found in Central America and North America.
