= Brachinus pectoralis =

Scientific classification
- Kingdom: Animalia
- Phylum: Arthropoda
- Clade: Pancrustacea
- Class: Insecta
- Order: Coleoptera
- Suborder: Adephaga
- Family: Carabidae
- Genus: Brachinus
- Species: B. pectoralis

Binomial name
- Brachinus pectoralis Dejean, 1825

Species of beetle

Brachinus pectoralis is a species of ground beetle in the Brachininae subfamily, found in Ukraine, Iran, and Russia.
