= Brachinus cibolensis =

Scientific classification
- Kingdom: Animalia
- Phylum: Arthropoda
- Clade: Pancrustacea
- Class: Insecta
- Order: Coleoptera
- Suborder: Adephaga
- Family: Carabidae
- Genus: Brachinus
- Species: B. cibolensis

Binomial name
- Brachinus cibolensis Erwin, 1970

Species of beetle

Brachinus cibolensis is a species of ground beetle in the family Carabidae. It is found in Central America and North America.
