= Brachinus alexandri =

Scientific classification
- Kingdom: Animalia
- Phylum: Arthropoda
- Clade: Pancrustacea
- Class: Insecta
- Order: Coleoptera
- Suborder: Adephaga
- Family: Carabidae
- Genus: Brachinus
- Species: B. alexandri

Binomial name
- Brachinus alexandri F. Battori, 1984

Species of beetle

Brachinus alexandri is a species of ground beetle from the Brachininae subfamily that can be found in Ukraine, southern part of Russia, Near East, Albania, Armenia, Azerbaijan, Asia Minor, Turkey, Bulgaria, Greece, The species are 9 millimetres (0.35 in) in length, and have black eyes and body, with orange head and legs.
