= Brachinus phaeocerus =

Scientific classification
- Kingdom: Animalia
- Phylum: Arthropoda
- Clade: Pancrustacea
- Class: Insecta
- Order: Coleoptera
- Suborder: Adephaga
- Family: Carabidae
- Genus: Brachinus
- Species: B. phaeocerus

Binomial name
- Brachinus phaeocerus Chaudoir, 1868

Species of beetle

Brachinus phaeocerus is a species of ground beetle in the family Carabidae. It is found in Central America and North America.
