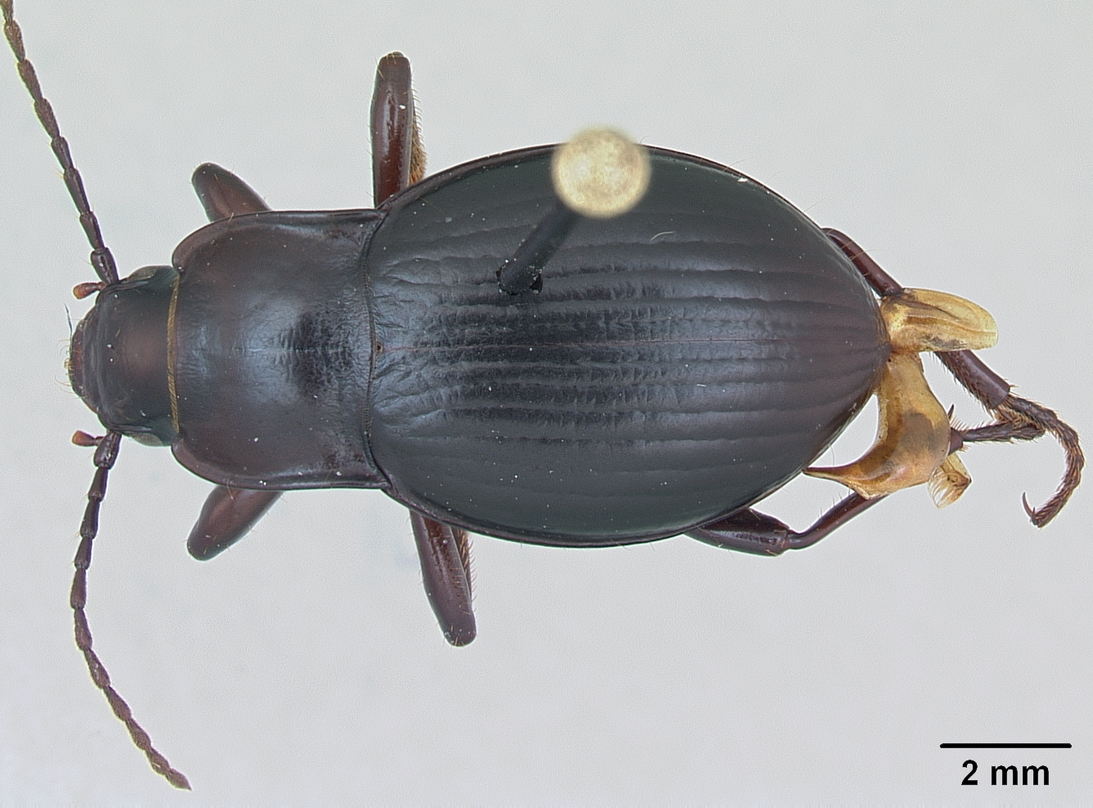
- Dorsal view of Metrius contractus specimen

Scientific classification
- Kingdom: Animalia
- Phylum: Arthropoda
- Class: Insecta
- Order: Coleoptera
- Suborder: Adephaga
- Family: Carabidae
- Subfamily: Paussinae
- Tribe: Metriini
- Genus: Metrius; Eschscholtz, 1829

= Metrius =

Genus of beetles

Metrius is a genus of beetles in the family Carabidae, containing the following species:

- Metrius contractus Eschscholtz, 1829
- Metrius explodens Bousquet & Goulet, 1990
