= Sinometrius =

Scientific classification
- Domain: Eukaryota
- Kingdom: Animalia
- Phylum: Arthropoda
- Class: Insecta
- Order: Coleoptera
- Suborder: Adephaga
- Family: Carabidae
- Subfamily: Paussinae
- Tribe: Metriini
- Genus: Sinometrius; Wrase & J.Schmidt, 2006

Species
- Sinometrius donggongensis Song & Peng, 2021; Sinometrius jaroslavi Deuve, 2020; Sinometrius turnai Wrase & J. Schmidt, 2006

Genus of beetles

Sinometrius is a genus of beetles in the family Carabidae.
