= Brachinus texanus =

Scientific classification
- Kingdom: Animalia
- Phylum: Arthropoda
- Clade: Pancrustacea
- Class: Insecta
- Order: Coleoptera
- Suborder: Adephaga
- Family: Carabidae
- Genus: Brachinus
- Species: B. texanus

Binomial name
- Brachinus texanus Chaudoir, 1868

Species of beetle

Brachinus texanus is a species of ground beetle in the genus Brachinus ("bombardier beetles"), in the family Carabidae ("ground beetles"). It is found in North America. Like other bombardier beetles, it can spray a boiling, corrosive liquid from its abdomen if provoked, and as such should not be handled.
