= Brachinus turkestanicus =

Scientific classification
- Kingdom: Animalia
- Phylum: Arthropoda
- Clade: Pancrustacea
- Class: Insecta
- Order: Coleoptera
- Suborder: Adephaga
- Family: Carabidae
- Subfamily: Brachininae
- Tribe: Brachinini
- Genus: Brachinus
- Species: B. turkestanicus

Binomial name
- Brachinus turkestanicus Liebke, 1928

Species of beetle

Brachinus turkestanicus is a species in the beetle family Carabidae. It is found in Kyrgyzstan and Uzbekistan.
