= Brachinus nigricornis =

Scientific classification
- Kingdom: Animalia
- Phylum: Arthropoda
- Clade: Pancrustacea
- Class: Insecta
- Order: Coleoptera
- Suborder: Adephaga
- Family: Carabidae
- Subfamily: Brachininae
- Tribe: Brachinini
- Genus: Brachinus
- Species: B. nigricornis

Binomial name
- Brachinus nigricornis Gebler, 1830

Synonyms
- Brachinus atricornis Fairmaire & Laboulbene, 1854; Brachinus incertus Brulle, 1834; Brachinus littoralis Motschulsky, 1864 [unav.]

Species of beetle

Brachinus nigricornis is a species in the beetle family Carabidae. It is found in Europe and Central Asia.
