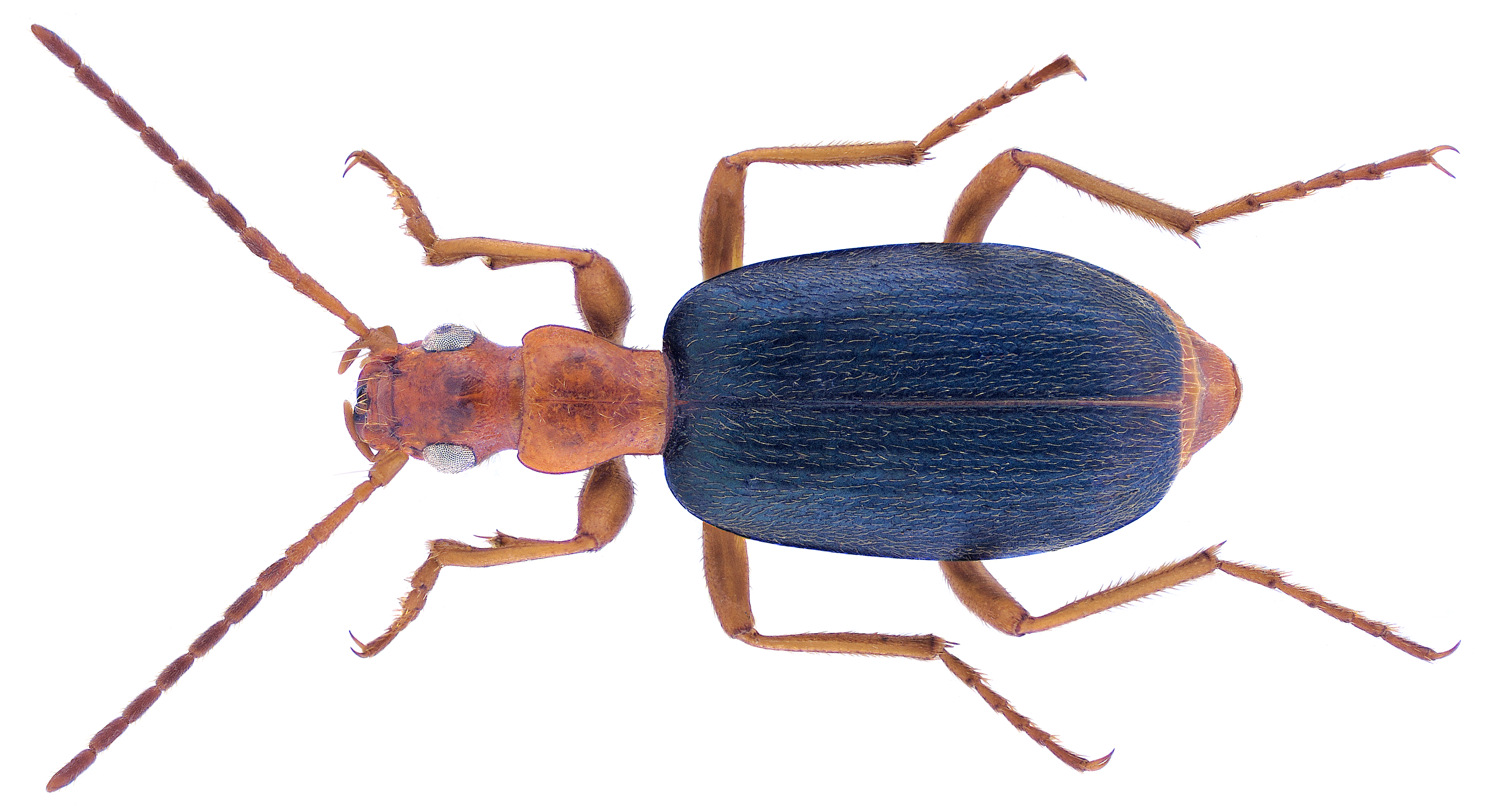

Scientific classification
- Kingdom: Animalia
- Phylum: Arthropoda
- Clade: Pancrustacea
- Class: Insecta
- Order: Coleoptera
- Suborder: Adephaga
- Family: Carabidae
- Genus: Brachinus
- Species: B. elegans

Binomial name
- Brachinus elegans Chaudoir, 1842

Synonyms
- Brachinus advena Schauberger, 1921; Brachinus ganglbaueri Apfelbeck, 1904; Brachinus velutinus Motschulsky, 1864

= Brachinus elegans =

Species of beetle

Brachinus elegans is a species of ground beetle in the Brachininae subfamily that can be found in Bulgaria, Albania, Austria, Czech Republic, France, Greece, Hungary, Italy, Moldova, Romania, Slovakia, Ukraine, all states of former Yugoslavia (except for North Macedonia), in Western Europe, and on the islands such as Sardinia and Sicily. Besides European countries it can be found in Armenia, Iran, Iraq, Kazakhstan and Turkey. It can also be found in North African country of Morocco. The species were also found in Georgia in 2004.
