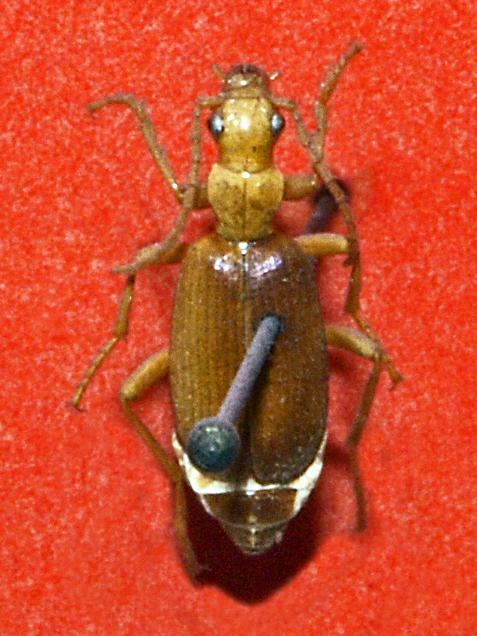
- Museum specimen

Scientific classification
- Kingdom: Animalia
- Phylum: Arthropoda
- Clade: Pancrustacea
- Class: Insecta
- Order: Coleoptera
- Suborder: Adephaga
- Family: Carabidae
- Genus: Brachinus
- Species: B. crepitans

Binomial name
- Brachinus crepitans (Linnaeus, 1758)

Synonyms
- Brachinus abdominaly Dallatorre, 1877 [unav.]; Brachinus altaicus Motschulsky, 1864; Brachinus annulatus Reitter, 1919 [unav.]; Brachinus atripennis Motschulsky, 1864: 215 [suppressed]; Brachinus coerulescens Dallatorre, 1877 [unav.]; Brachinus costatus G.Muller, 1911; Brachinus fallax Apfelbeck, 1904 [nec Peringuey, 1896]; Brachinus femoratus Letzner, 1851 [unav.]; Brachinus fimbriolatus Lucas, 1846; Brachinus flavosuturatus Eichler, 1924; Brachinus gracilis Motschulsky, 1844; Brachinus jeanneli Razet, 1951; Brachinus joenius Patti, 1844; Brachinus immaculatus Letzner, 1851 [unav.]; Brachinus kirghis Iljin, 1925; Brachinus morio Gagliardi, 1941; Brachinus nigripennis Letzner, 1851 [unav.]; Brachinus obscuricornis Brulle, 1834 [nec Menetries, 1832]; Brachinus obscurus Heer, 1837; Brachinus rufothoracicus Marcu, 1929; Brachinus siculus Patti, 1844; Brachinus scoteinus Kolenati,1845; Brachinus strepitans Duftschmid, 1812; Brachinus sulcatulus Motschulsky, 1850; Brachinus tibialis Letzner, 1851 [unav.]; Brachinus virescens Letzner, 1851 [unav.]; Brachinus virescens Dallatorre, 1877 [unav.]; Carabus crepitans Linnaeus, 1758

= Brachinus crepitans =

Species of beetle

Brachinus crepitans is a species of ground beetle in the Brachininae subfamily that can be found in Europe, central and west Asia, and northern Africa.

== Etymology ==
The name of the species derived from a Latin word which means crackle because it makes crackling noise.

== Description ==
Brachinus crepitans can reach a length of 7–10.2 millimetres (0.28–0.40 in), with an average of 8 millimetres (0.31 in). Head and protum are brown, while elytrae are greenish. The species is very similar to Brachinus efflans.

== Distribution ==
=== Ukrainian distribution ===
In Ukraine the species is found in the steppes of Lviv, near Osovitsa village of Podolian Province in western Ukraine. It is also found in Zolochiv, Kharkiv Oblast.

=== UK Distribution ===
The species can be found in southern England and southern Wales where it is abundant in coastal areas. The inland locations have been sited as well through, the most recent of which are Cotswolds and Northamptonshire where it was discovered in limestones. It was also found in boulder clay in Huntingdonshire, and in Brotheridge Green, an old railway line and wildlife reserve that was located near Malvern, Worcestershire. The species was found in the 1970s by Ian L. Crombie.

== Ecology ==
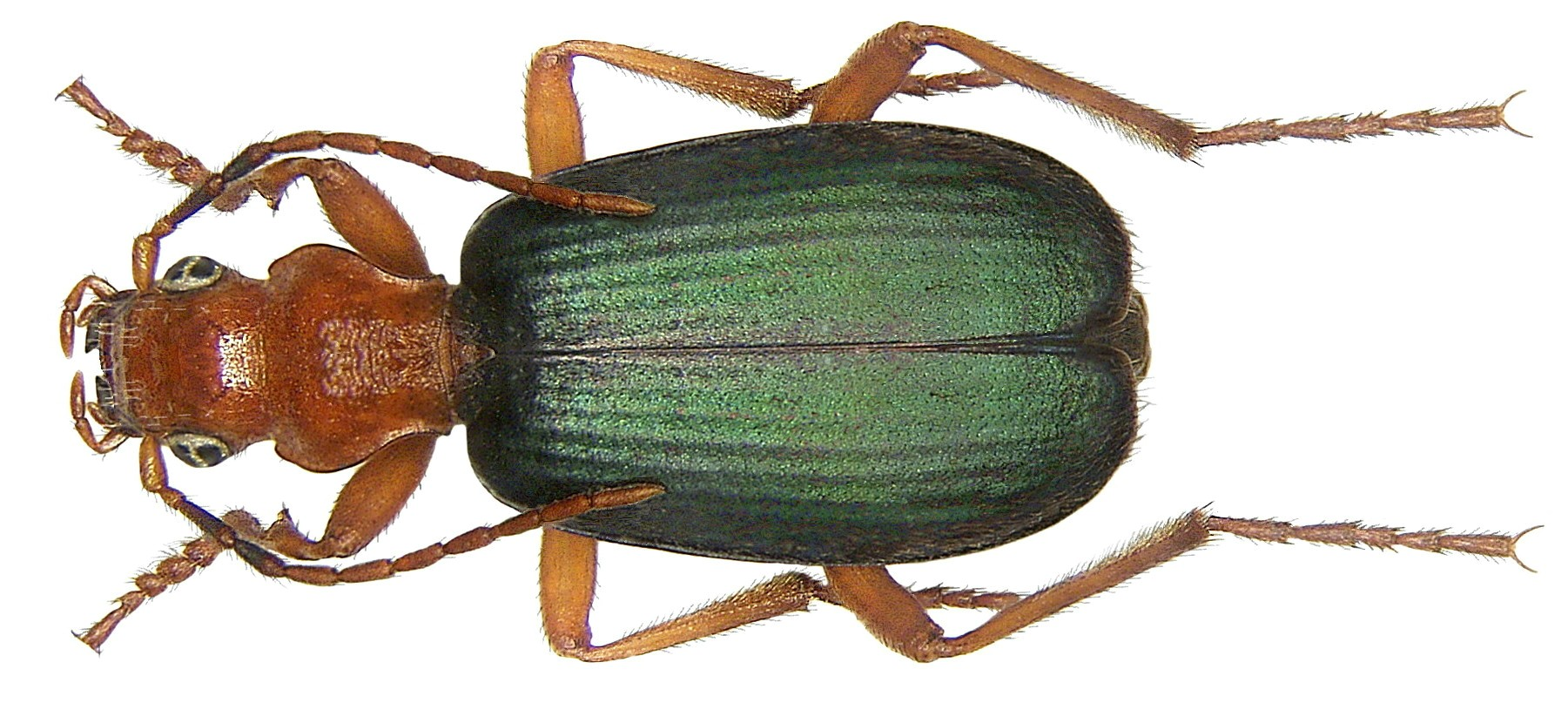
Brachinus crepitans

The species fly from May to June. The lifecycle is not known but the larvae are thought to be external parasites that feed on the pupae of other beetle species including Amara convexiuscula and a staphylinid beetle, Tasgius ater (Gravenhorst, 1802).

When disturbed, the species shoot liquid from two glands through their anus. Since one of the glands contains hydrogen peroxide and the other hydroquinone, when two the contents mix with enzymes in a "firing chamber", the liquid explodes, and harms the attackers.

== Habitat ==
The species can be found in dry and sunny areas, and usually under stones. It can also be found in calcareous grasslands, arable land, and chalk quarries.
