= Brachinus costipennis =

Scientific classification
- Kingdom: Animalia
- Phylum: Arthropoda
- Clade: Pancrustacea
- Class: Insecta
- Order: Coleoptera
- Suborder: Adephaga
- Family: Carabidae
- Genus: Brachinus
- Species: B. costipennis

Binomial name
- Brachinus costipennis Motschulsky, 1859

Species of beetle

Brachinus costipennis is a species of ground beetle in the family Carabidae. It is found in Central America and North America.
