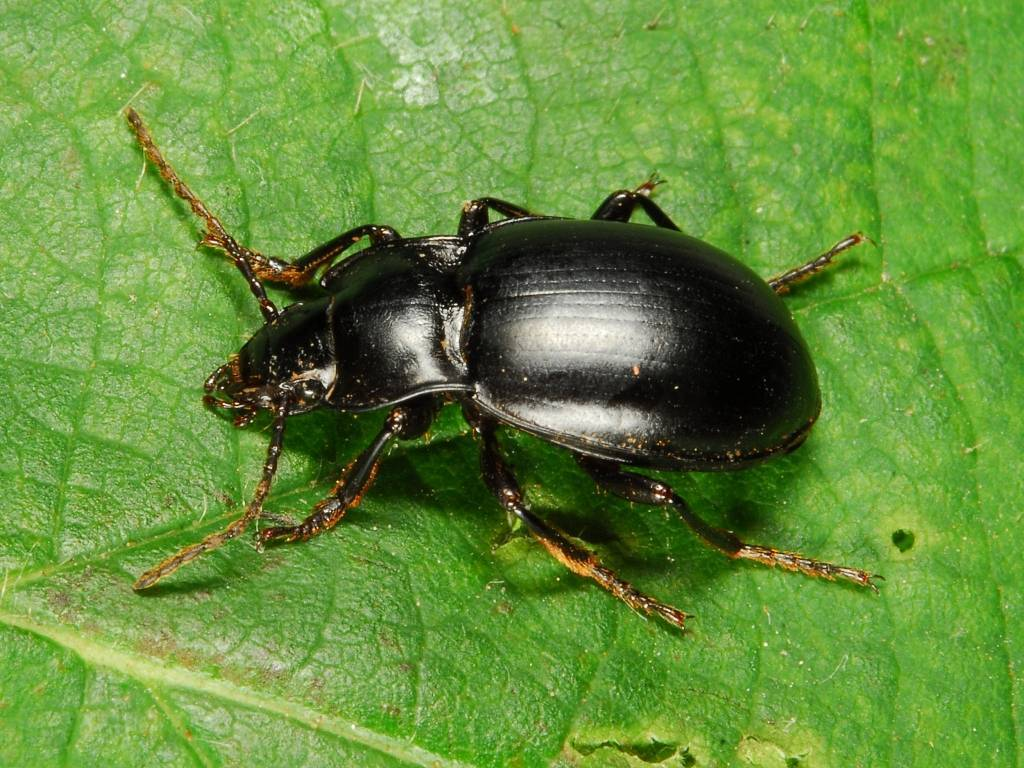
- Metrius contractus, California

Scientific classification
- Domain: Eukaryota
- Kingdom: Animalia
- Phylum: Arthropoda
- Class: Insecta
- Order: Coleoptera
- Suborder: Adephaga
- Family: Carabidae
- Subfamily: Paussinae
- Tribe: Metriini; LeConte, 1853

= Metriini =

Tribe of beetles

Metriini is a tribe of ground beetles in the family Carabidae. There are at least three genera and about six described species in Metriini.

== Genera ==
These genera belong to the tribe Metriini:

- Metrius Eschscholtz, 1829 (2 species, found in North America)
- Sinometrius Wrase & J.Schmidt, 2006 (3 species, found in China)
- † Kryzhanovskiana Kataev & Kirejtshuk, 2019 Burmese amber, Myanmar, Cenomanian
