= Brachinus olgae =

Scientific classification
- Kingdom: Animalia
- Phylum: Arthropoda
- Clade: Pancrustacea
- Class: Insecta
- Order: Coleoptera
- Suborder: Adephaga
- Family: Carabidae
- Genus: Brachinus
- Species: B. olgae

Binomial name
- Brachinus olgae Arribas, 1993

Species of beetle

Brachinus olgae is a species of ground beetle in the Brachinoaptinus subgenus that is endemic to Spain.
