= Brachinus vulcanoides =

Scientific classification
- Kingdom: Animalia
- Phylum: Arthropoda
- Clade: Pancrustacea
- Class: Insecta
- Order: Coleoptera
- Suborder: Adephaga
- Family: Carabidae
- Genus: Brachinus
- Species: B. vulcanoides

Binomial name
- Brachinus vulcanoides Erwin, 1969

Species of beetle

Brachinus vulcanoides is a species of ground beetle in the family Carabidae. It is found in North America.
