= Brachinus albarracinus =

Scientific classification
- Kingdom: Animalia
- Phylum: Arthropoda
- Clade: Pancrustacea
- Class: Insecta
- Order: Coleoptera
- Suborder: Adephaga
- Family: Carabidae
- Genus: Brachinus
- Species: B. albarracinus

Binomial name
- Brachinus albarracinus Wagner, 1926

Synonyms
- Brachinus espanoli Jeanne, 1972

Species of beetle

Brachinus albarracinus is a species of ground beetle from the Brachininae subfamily that is endemic to Spain.
