= Brachinus berytensis =

Scientific classification
- Kingdom: Animalia
- Phylum: Arthropoda
- Clade: Pancrustacea
- Class: Insecta
- Order: Coleoptera
- Suborder: Adephaga
- Family: Carabidae
- Genus: Brachinus
- Species: B. berytensis

Binomial name
- Brachinus berytensis Reiche & Saulcy, 1855

Species of beetle

Brachinus berytensis is a species of ground beetle in the Brachininae subfamily that can be found in Bulgaria, Cyprus, and Greece. It can also be found in the Near Eastern countries such as Armenia, Turkey (more precisely, Asia Minor), Israel, Lebanon, and Syria. The species look similar to Brachinus bombarda.
