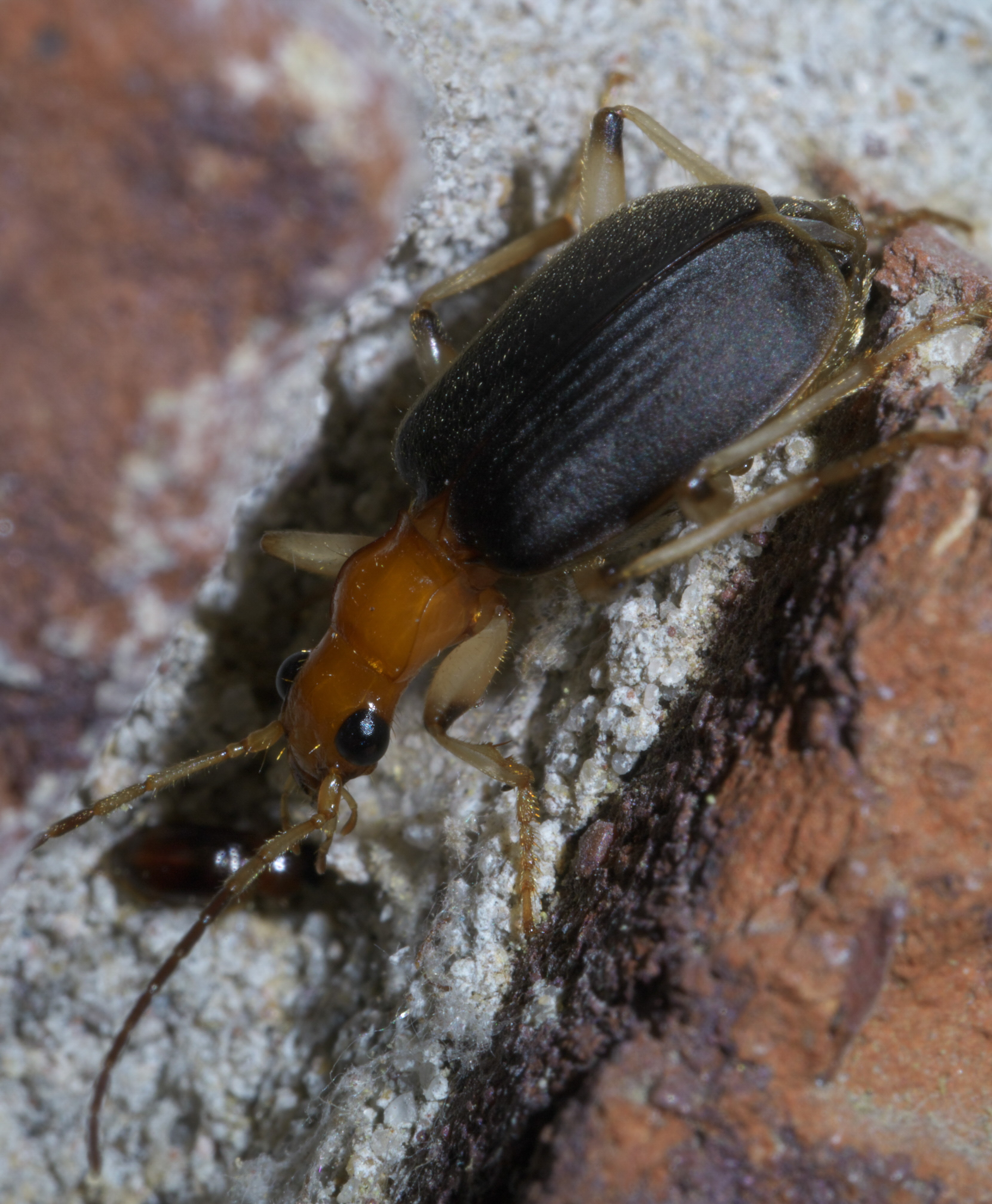

Scientific classification
- Kingdom: Animalia
- Phylum: Arthropoda
- Clade: Pancrustacea
- Class: Insecta
- Order: Coleoptera
- Suborder: Adephaga
- Family: Carabidae
- Genus: Brachinus
- Species: B. adustipennis

Binomial name
- Brachinus adustipennis Erwin, 1969

= Brachinus adustipennis =

Species of beetle

Brachinus adustipennis is a species of ground beetle in the family Carabidae. It is found in the Caribbean Sea, Central America, and North America.

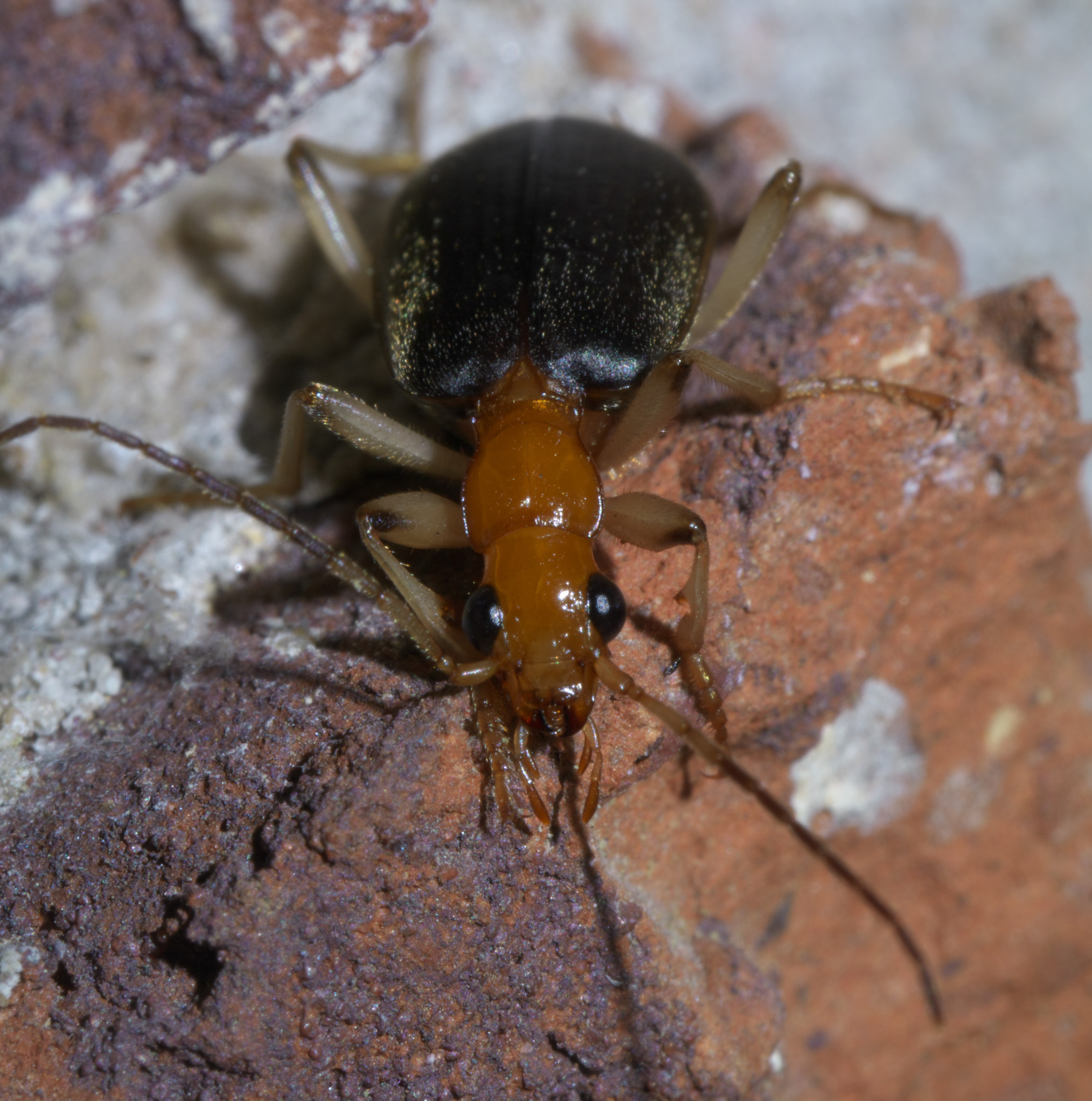

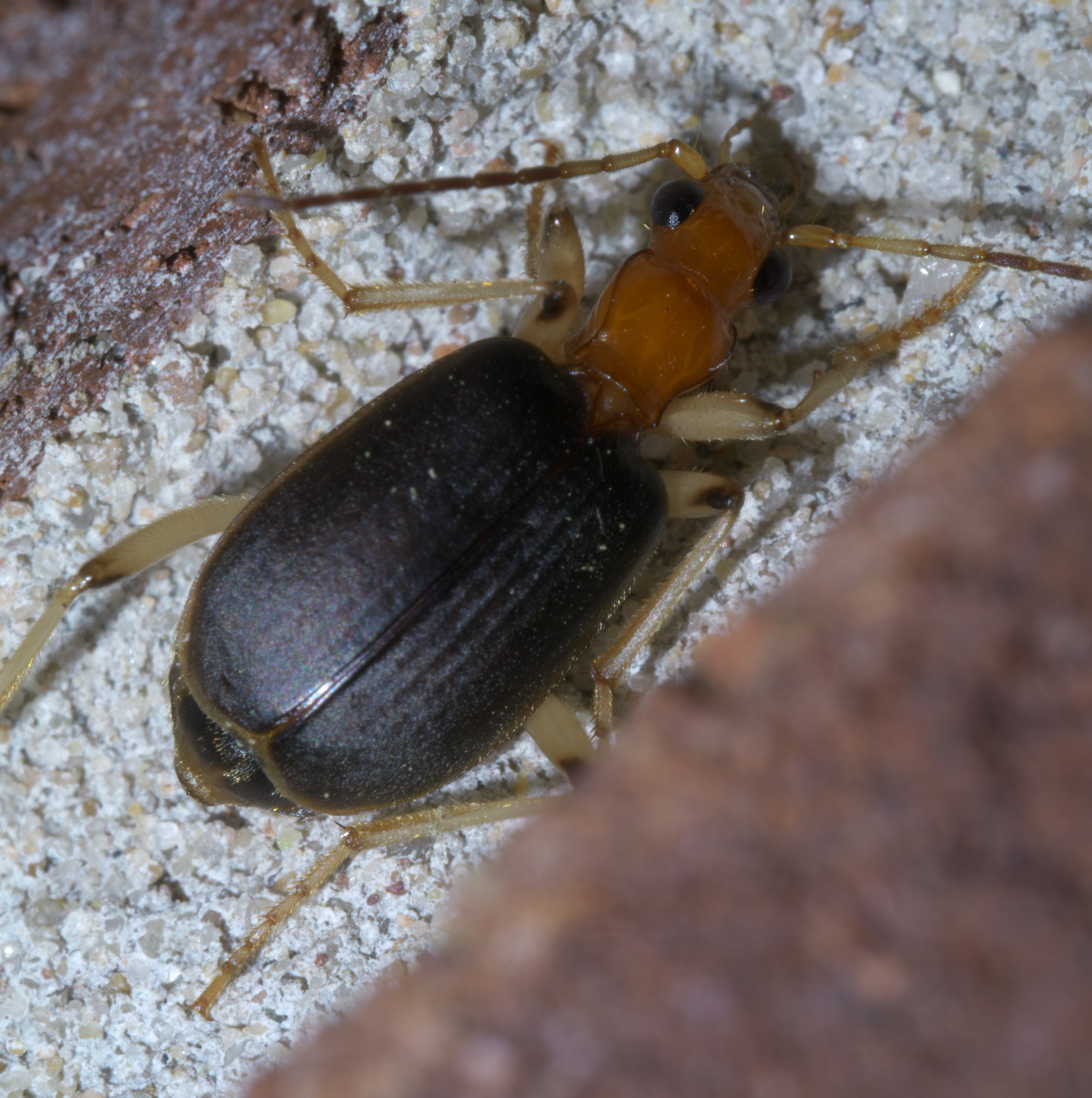
