= Brachinus italicus =

Scientific classification
- Kingdom: Animalia
- Phylum: Arthropoda
- Clade: Pancrustacea
- Class: Insecta
- Order: Coleoptera
- Suborder: Adephaga
- Family: Carabidae
- Genus: Brachinus
- Species: B. italicus

Binomial name
- Brachinus italicus (Dejean, 1831)

Synonyms
- Aptinus italicus Dejean, 1831

Species of beetle

Brachinus italicus is a species of ground beetle from the Brachininae subfamily that can be found in Italy (Note: "Brachinus italicus (Dejean, 1831)". Global Biodiversity Information Facility.) and on the island of Sicily. (Note: "Brachinus (Brachinoaptinus) italicus (Dejean, 1831)". Fauna Europaea.)
