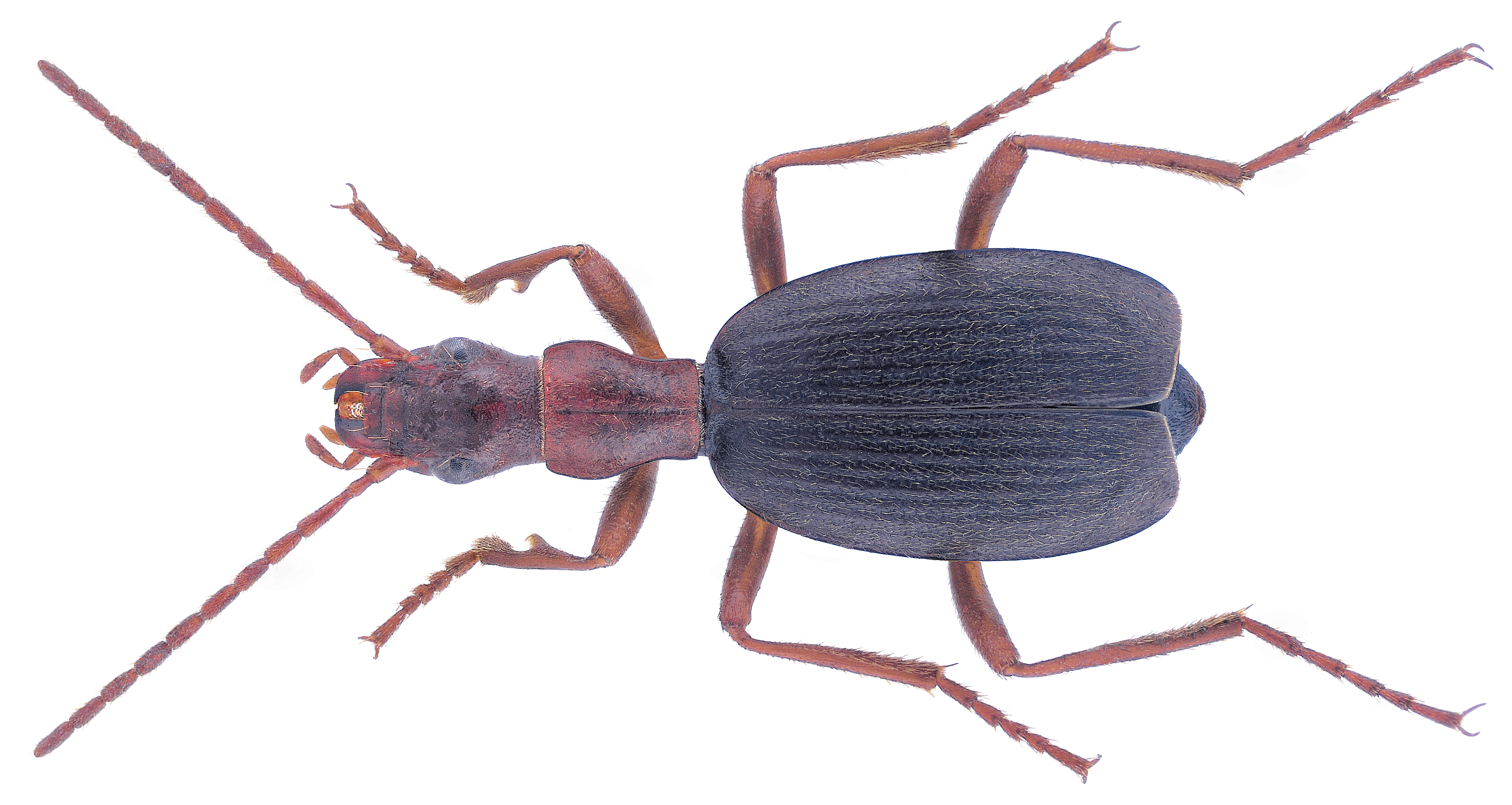
- Brachinus bellicosus

Scientific classification
- Kingdom: Animalia
- Phylum: Arthropoda
- Clade: Pancrustacea
- Class: Insecta
- Order: Coleoptera
- Suborder: Adephaga
- Family: Carabidae
- Genus: Brachinus
- Species: B. bellicosus

Binomial name
- Brachinus bellicosus L. Dufour, 1820

Synonyms
- Brachinus hispalensis Rambur, 1837; Aptinus jaculans Dejean, 1824

= Brachinus bellicosus =

Species of beetle

Brachinus bellicosus is a species of ground beetle in the Brachininae subfamily that can be found in France, Portugal, and Spain.
