= Brachinus andalusiacus =

Scientific classification
- Kingdom: Animalia
- Phylum: Arthropoda
- Clade: Pancrustacea
- Class: Insecta
- Order: Coleoptera
- Suborder: Adephaga
- Family: Carabidae
- Genus: Brachinus
- Species: B. andalusiacus

Binomial name
- Brachinus andalusiacus Rambur, 1837

Species of beetle

Brachinus andalusiacus is a species of ground beetle in the Carabinae subfamily that can be found in Spain and Morocco.
