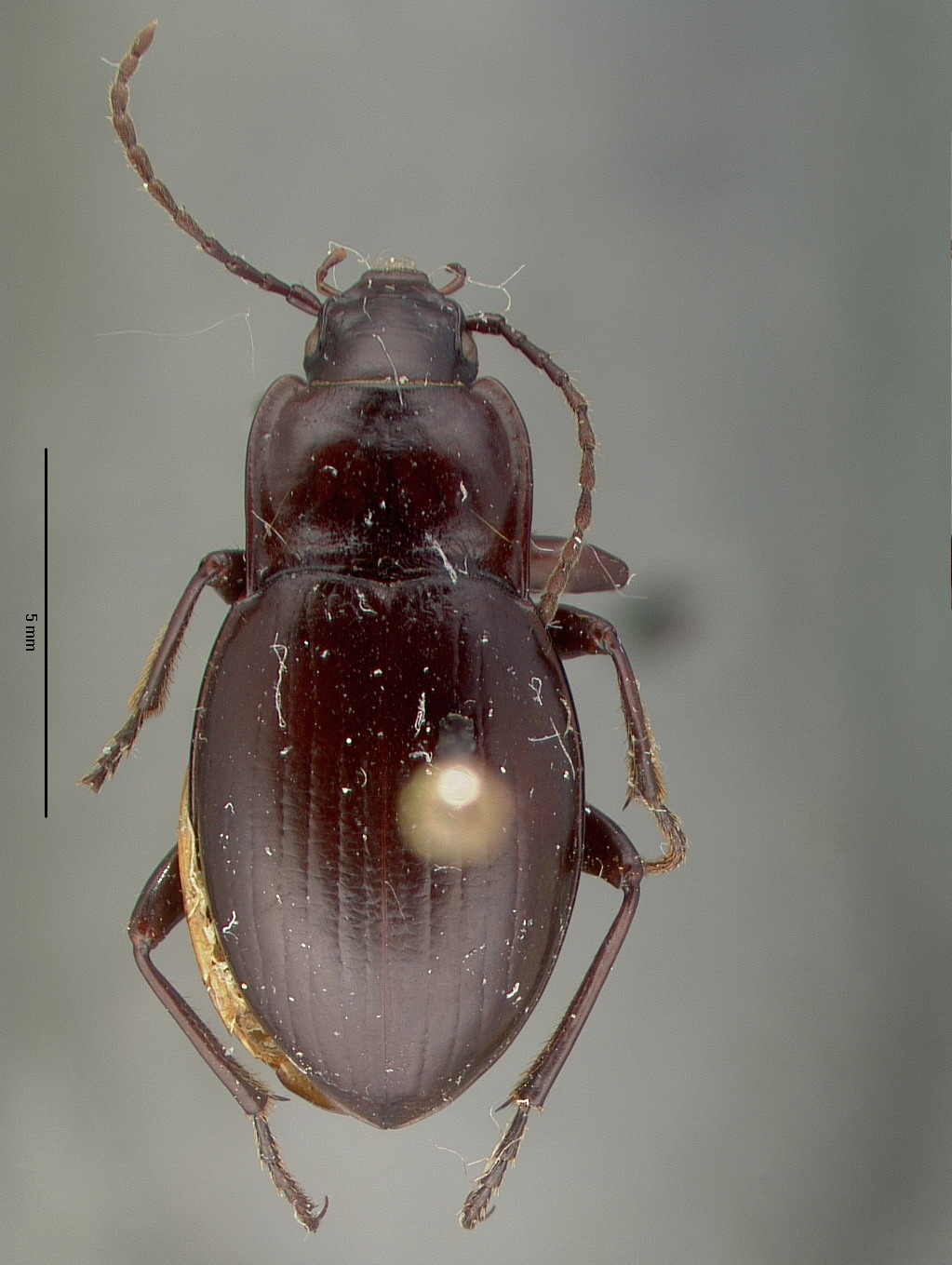

Scientific classification
- Domain: Eukaryota
- Kingdom: Animalia
- Phylum: Arthropoda
- Class: Insecta
- Order: Coleoptera
- Suborder: Adephaga
- Family: Carabidae
- Genus: Metrius
- Species: M. explodens

Binomial name
- Metrius explodens Bousquet & Goulet, 1990

= Metrius explodens =

Species of beetle

Metrius explodens is a species of ground beetle. It is found in Idaho.
