= Brachinus testaceus =

Scientific classification
- Kingdom: Animalia
- Phylum: Arthropoda
- Clade: Pancrustacea
- Class: Insecta
- Order: Coleoptera
- Suborder: Adephaga
- Family: Carabidae
- Genus: Brachinus
- Species: B. testaceus

Binomial name
- Brachinus testaceus Rambur, 1837

Synonyms
- Brachinus microphthalmus Reitter, 1919

Species of beetle

Brachinus testaceus is a species of ground beetle in the Brachininae subfamily that is endemic to Spain.
