= Brachinus angustatus =

Scientific classification
- Kingdom: Animalia
- Phylum: Arthropoda
- Clade: Pancrustacea
- Class: Insecta
- Order: Coleoptera
- Suborder: Adephaga
- Family: Carabidae
- Genus: Brachinus
- Species: B. angustatus

Binomial name
- Brachinus angustatus Dejean, 1831

Synonyms
- Brachinus amabilis Reitter, 1919; Brachinus atropunctatus Pic, 1919

Species of beetle

Brachinus angustatus is a species of ground beetle from the Carabinae subfamily that can be found in Spain and North African countries such as Algeria and Morocco. Brachinus angustatus was one of the many beetles found in the collection of Count Pierre François Marie Auguste Dejean
