= Brachinus alternans =

Scientific classification
- Kingdom: Animalia
- Phylum: Arthropoda
- Clade: Pancrustacea
- Class: Insecta
- Order: Coleoptera
- Suborder: Adephaga
- Family: Carabidae
- Genus: Brachinus
- Species: B. alternans

Binomial name
- Brachinus alternans Dejean, 1825

Species of beetle

Brachinus alternans is a species of ground beetle in the family Carabidae. It is found in Central America and North America.
