= Brachinus pateri =

Scientific classification
- Kingdom: Animalia
- Phylum: Arthropoda
- Clade: Pancrustacea
- Class: Insecta
- Order: Coleoptera
- Suborder: Adephaga
- Family: Carabidae
- Genus: Brachinus
- Species: B. pateri

Binomial name
- Brachinus pateri Puel, 1938

Species of beetle

Brachinus pateri is a species of ground beetle in the Brachininae subfamily that is endemic to Spain. The species have 3 subspecies all of which are endemic to Spain.
