= Sinometrius turnai =

Scientific classification
- Kingdom: Animalia
- Phylum: Arthropoda
- Class: Insecta
- Order: Coleoptera
- Suborder: Adephaga
- Family: Carabidae
- Genus: Sinometrius; Wrase & J.Schmidt, 2006
- Species: S. turnai

Binomial name
- Sinometrius turnai Wrase & J.Schmidt, 2006

Genus of beetles

Sinometrius turnai is a species of beetle in the family Carabidae.
