= Brachinus lateralis =

Scientific classification
- Kingdom: Animalia
- Phylum: Arthropoda
- Clade: Pancrustacea
- Class: Insecta
- Order: Coleoptera
- Suborder: Adephaga
- Family: Carabidae
- Genus: Brachinus
- Species: B. lateralis

Binomial name
- Brachinus lateralis Dejean, 1831

Species of beetle

Brachinus lateralis is a species of ground beetle in the family Carabidae.
