= Brachinus efflans =

Scientific classification
- Kingdom: Animalia
- Phylum: Arthropoda
- Clade: Pancrustacea
- Class: Insecta
- Order: Coleoptera
- Suborder: Adephaga
- Family: Carabidae
- Genus: Brachinus
- Species: B. efflans

Binomial name
- Brachinus efflans Dejean & Boisduval, 1829

Synonyms
- Brachinus etslans Dejean, 1830; Brachinus fleisheri Reitter, 1919

Species of beetle

Brachinus efflans is a species of ground beetle in the Brachininae subfamily that can be found in Bulgaria, Germany, Italy, Portugal, Spain, Gibraltar, and on the islands such as Sicily. It can also be found in North African countries such as Algeria, Morocco, Tunisia, and is common in Syria too. The species is black coloured with red head and legs, and is similar to Brachinus crepitans.
