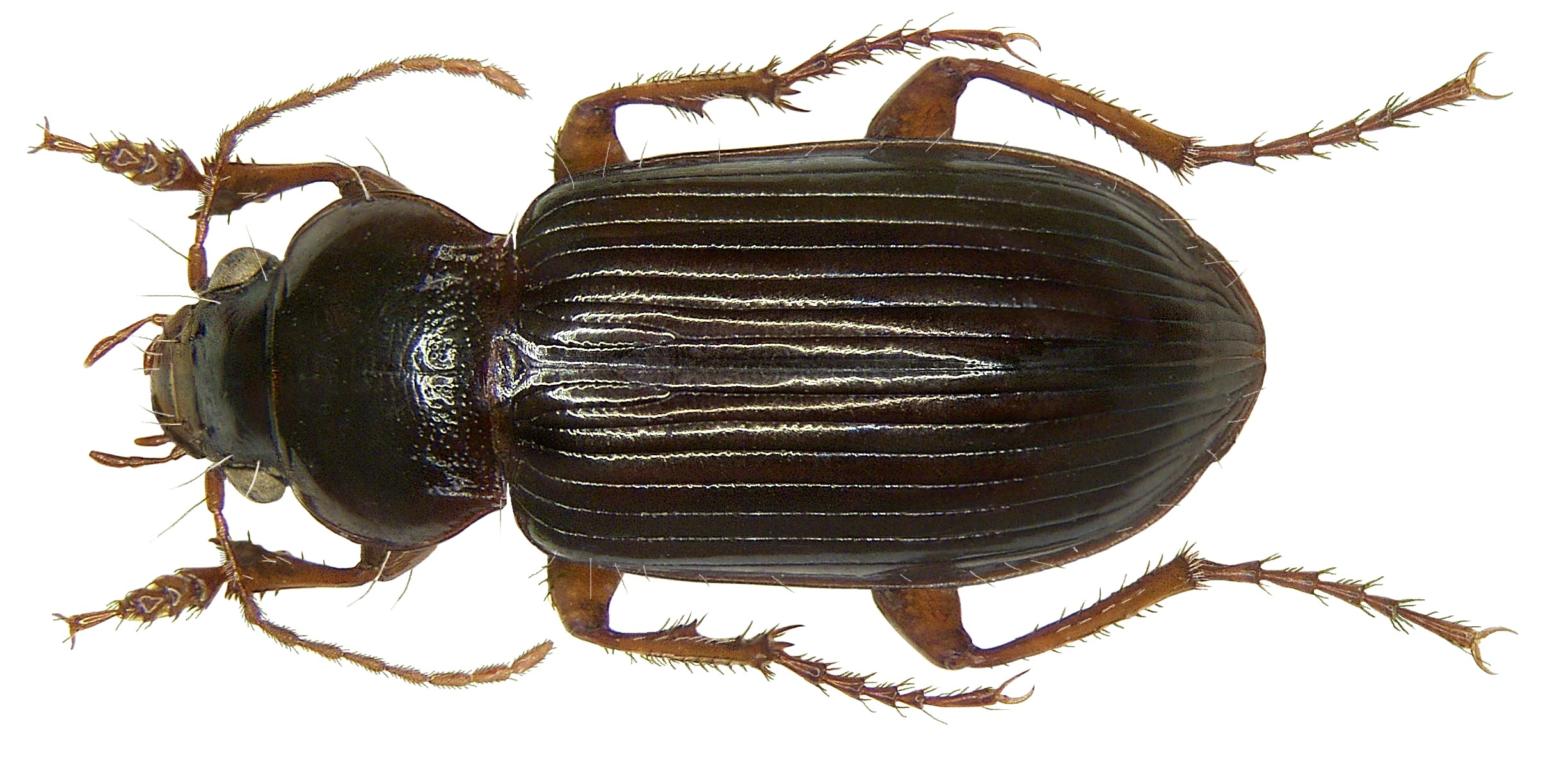

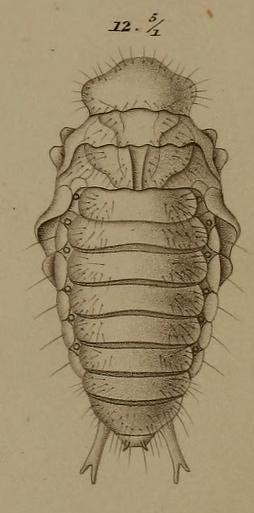
- Nymph

Scientific classification
- Kingdom: Animalia
- Phylum: Arthropoda
- Clade: Pancrustacea
- Class: Insecta
- Order: Coleoptera
- Suborder: Adephaga
- Family: Carabidae
- Genus: Amara
- Subgenus: Curtonotus
- Species: A. convexiuscula

Binomial name
- Amara convexiuscula (Marsham, 1802)

Synonyms
- Carabus convexiuscula Marsham, 1802; Amara bohemica Fassati, 1944; Leirus intermedia Motschulsky, 1844

= Amara convexiuscula =

Species of beetle

Amara convexiuscula is a species of ground beetle native to Europe and Asia.
