= Brachinus ejaculans =

Scientific classification
- Kingdom: Animalia
- Phylum: Arthropoda
- Clade: Pancrustacea
- Class: Insecta
- Order: Coleoptera
- Suborder: Adephaga
- Family: Carabidae
- Genus: Brachinus
- Species: B. ejaculans

Binomial name
- Brachinus ejaculans Fisher von Waldheim, 1828

Synonyms
- Brachinus costulatus Motschahsky, 1844; Brachinus dubius Ballion, 1871; Brachinus graecus Dejean, 1831; Brachinus kosak Iljin, 1923; Brachinus turcomanus Iljin, 1923

Species of beetle

Brachinus ejaculans is a species of ground beetle in the Brachininae subfamily that can be found in Bulgaria, Albania, Greece, Hungary, Moldova, Luxembourg, Romania, Ukraine, southern part of Russia, and in every state of former Yugoslavia, but it is doubtful whether it is present in Slovenia. It can also be found in East Palaearctic, Near and Middle Eastern countries, including Afghanistan, Armenia, Azerbaijan, Georgia, Iran, Iraq, Kazakhstan, Kyrgyzstan, Turkmenistan, Turkey, Uzbekistan, Israel, Jordan, Lebanon, Syria, and Sinai Peninsula of Egypt.
