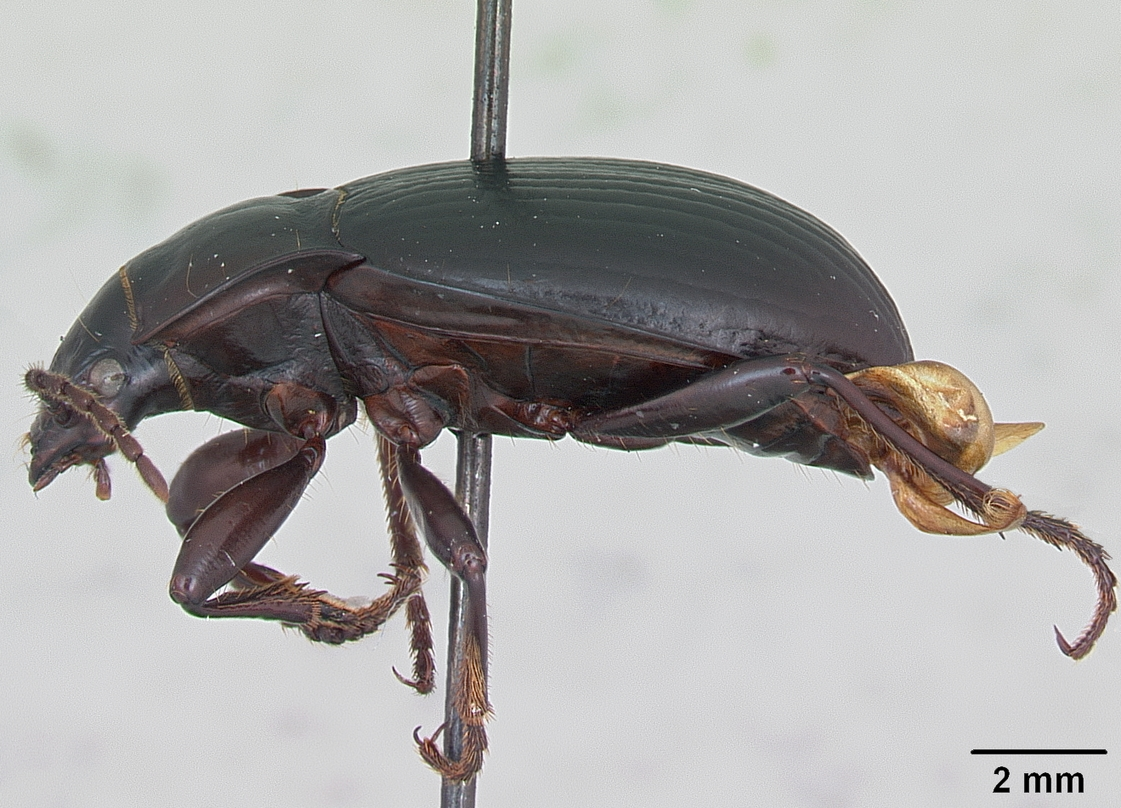

Scientific classification
- Domain: Eukaryota
- Kingdom: Animalia
- Phylum: Arthropoda
- Class: Insecta
- Order: Coleoptera
- Suborder: Adephaga
- Family: Carabidae
- Genus: Metrius
- Species: M. contractus

Binomial name
- Metrius contractus Eschscholtz, 1829

= Metrius contractus =

Species of beetle

Metrius contractus is a species of ground beetle. It was described by Johann Friedrich von Eschscholtz in 1829.
