= Trochalus lukuledianus =

Scientific classification
- Kingdom: Animalia
- Phylum: Arthropoda
- Clade: Pancrustacea
- Class: Insecta
- Order: Coleoptera
- Suborder: Polyphaga
- Infraorder: Scarabaeiformia
- Family: Scarabaeidae
- Genus: Trochalus
- Species: T. lukuledianus

Binomial name
- Trochalus lukuledianus Moser, 1920

Species of beetle

Trochalus lukuledianus is a species of beetle of the family Scarabaeidae. It is found in Tanzania.

== Description ==
Adults reach a length of about 8 mm. The upper surface is blackish-brown and dull, while the underside is reddish-brown and shiny. The punctation of the head and pronotum is less pronounced than in similar species Trochalus fraterculus and the punctation of the elytra is not quite as dense.
