= Trochalus sebakuanus =

Scientific classification
- Kingdom: Animalia
- Phylum: Arthropoda
- Class: Insecta
- Order: Coleoptera
- Suborder: Polyphaga
- Infraorder: Scarabaeiformia
- Family: Scarabaeidae
- Genus: Trochalus
- Species: T. sebakuanus

Binomial name
- Trochalus sebakuanus Péringuey, 1904

Species of beetle

Trochalus sebakuanus is a species of beetle of the family Scarabaeidae. It is found in Zimbabwe.

== Description ==
Adults reach a length of about 5 mm. The shape, colour, and sculpture is similar to that of Trochalus urbanus, but it differs by the shape of the clypeus, which is constricted laterally, although much less strongly than in the other species of Trochalus. The median part of the anterior margin is also plainly angular, which is not the case in T. urbanus.
