= Trochalus politus =

Scientific classification
- Kingdom: Animalia
- Phylum: Arthropoda
- Clade: Pancrustacea
- Class: Insecta
- Order: Coleoptera
- Suborder: Polyphaga
- Infraorder: Scarabaeiformia
- Family: Scarabaeidae
- Genus: Trochalus
- Species: T. politus

Binomial name
- Trochalus politus Moser, 1919

Species of beetle

Trochalus politus is a species of beetle of the family Scarabaeidae. It is found in Angola.

== Description ==
Adults reach a length of about 8 mm. They are similar in form to Trochalus kigonseranus, but differently coloured and distinguished by the clypeus structure. They are black, strongly glossy with a metallic sheen. The head is rather densely and strongly punctate. The surface of the pronotum is densely and rather strongly punctate. On the elytra, the intervals are shallow and rather densely punctate and on the pygidium, the punctures are denser anteriorly than posteriorly.
