= Trochalus bicarinatus =

Scientific classification
- Kingdom: Animalia
- Phylum: Arthropoda
- Clade: Pancrustacea
- Class: Insecta
- Order: Coleoptera
- Suborder: Polyphaga
- Infraorder: Scarabaeiformia
- Family: Scarabaeidae
- Genus: Trochalus
- Species: T. bicarinatus

Binomial name
- Trochalus bicarinatus Moser, 1919

Species of beetle

Trochalus bicarinatus is a species of beetle of the family Scarabaeidae. It is found in Tanzania.

== Description ==
Adults reach a length of about 9 mm. They are similar to Trochalus conspicuus, but somewhat smaller. The pronotum is more than twice as wide as it is long posteriorly, narrowing anteriorly and its surface is densely punctate.
