= Trochalus schoutedeni =

Scientific classification
- Kingdom: Animalia
- Phylum: Arthropoda
- Clade: Pancrustacea
- Class: Insecta
- Order: Coleoptera
- Suborder: Polyphaga
- Infraorder: Scarabaeiformia
- Family: Scarabaeidae
- Genus: Trochalus
- Species: T. schoutedeni

Binomial name
- Trochalus schoutedeni Moser, 1924

Species of beetle

Trochalus schoutedeni is a species of beetle of the family Scarabaeidae. It is found in the Democratic Republic of the Congo.

== Description ==
Adults reach a length of about 7 mm (0.28 in). They are similar to Trochalus kabindanus. They are dull and black above, but dark brown below, with shiny legs. The head, frons, and posterior part of the clypeus are fairly densely punctured, while the anterior part of the clypeus is sparsely punctured. The antennae are reddish-yellow. The elytra have rows of punctures, with the intervals flat and covered in fairly dense punctures. The pygidium is moderately closely punctured.
