= Trochalus ukamicus =

Scientific classification
- Kingdom: Animalia
- Phylum: Arthropoda
- Clade: Pancrustacea
- Class: Insecta
- Order: Coleoptera
- Suborder: Polyphaga
- Infraorder: Scarabaeiformia
- Family: Scarabaeidae
- Genus: Trochalus
- Species: T. ukamicus

Binomial name
- Trochalus ukamicus Moser, 1919

Species of beetle

Trochalus ukamicus is a species of beetle of the family Scarabaeidae. It is found in Tanzania.

== Description ==
Adults reach a length of about 9 mm. They are similar in shape to Trochalus saginatus. The head is moderately densely punctate. The surface of the pronotum is finely punctate and the elytra have rows of punctures, with the intervals shallow and moderately densely punctate. On the pygidium, the fine umbilical punctures are rather widely spaced.
