= Trochalus major =

Scientific classification
- Kingdom: Animalia
- Phylum: Arthropoda
- Clade: Pancrustacea
- Class: Insecta
- Order: Coleoptera
- Suborder: Polyphaga
- Infraorder: Scarabaeiformia
- Family: Scarabaeidae
- Genus: Trochalus
- Species: T. major

Binomial name
- Trochalus major (Frey, 1960)

Synonyms
- Epitrochalus major Frey, 1960

Species of beetle

Trochalus major is a species of beetle of the family Scarabaeidae. It is found in Angola.

== Description ==
Adults reach a length of about 8.5 mm. They are medium brown and very similar to Trochalus damarus, but differs from it by a flatly rounded projection on the lateral margin of the pronotum, which makes the posterior lateral margin concave. The anterior angles of the pronotum are pointed. The ridge on the posterior margin of the vertex is continuously wrinkled and not smooth in the middle as in T. damarus. The punctures of the elytra are mostly nave-shaped. The pronotum and the scutellum are very densely punctate. The punctures of the elytra are approximately their diameter apart in the middle. On the sides, the punctation becomes somewhat more widely spaced. All ventral segments have long hairs.
