= Trochalus flavicornis =

Scientific classification
- Kingdom: Animalia
- Phylum: Arthropoda
- Clade: Pancrustacea
- Class: Insecta
- Order: Coleoptera
- Suborder: Polyphaga
- Infraorder: Scarabaeiformia
- Family: Scarabaeidae
- Genus: Trochalus
- Species: T. flavicornis

Binomial name
- Trochalus flavicornis Moser, 1924

Species of beetle

Trochalus flavicornis is a species of beetle of the family Scarabaeidae. It is found in Tanzania.

== Description ==
Adults reach a length of about 6 mm (0.24 in). They are similar to Trochalus byrrhinus. They are blackish-brown, with base of the pronotum and elytra opaque. The head is coarsely and rather densely punctate and the antennae are yellow.
