= Trochalus nigrescens =

Scientific classification
- Kingdom: Animalia
- Phylum: Arthropoda
- Clade: Pancrustacea
- Class: Insecta
- Order: Coleoptera
- Suborder: Polyphaga
- Infraorder: Scarabaeiformia
- Family: Scarabaeidae
- Genus: Trochalus
- Species: T. nigrescens

Binomial name
- Trochalus nigrescens Moser, 1919

Species of beetle

Trochalus nigrescens is a species of beetle of the family Scarabaeidae. It is found in Tanzania.

== Description ==
Adults reach a length of about 9 mm. They are similar to Trochalus wauanus, but less rounded and with less broadened hind femora. They are blackish-brown and dull on the upper side, and brown and glossy on the underside. The head is rather widely and finely punctate. The pronotum is similarly formed to that of wauanus and not tomentose in the anterior part. The punctures on the pygidium are very irregular. The underside is widely punctate, finely in the middle, somewhat stronger at the sides.
