= Trochalus iridicolor =

Scientific classification
- Kingdom: Animalia
- Phylum: Arthropoda
- Clade: Pancrustacea
- Class: Insecta
- Order: Coleoptera
- Suborder: Polyphaga
- Infraorder: Scarabaeiformia
- Family: Scarabaeidae
- Genus: Trochalus
- Species: T. iridicolor

Binomial name
- Trochalus iridicolor Kolbe, 1914

Species of beetle

Trochalus iridicolor is a species of beetle of the family Scarabaeidae. It is found in Tanzania.

== Description ==
Adults reach a length of about 9 mm (0.35 in). They are similar to Trochalus exasperans in size, shape, and colour. The upper surface is glossy brown, with the elytra brass-coloured with an iridescent blue hue. The underside is dark brown and the legs are reddish-brown. The pygidium is shiny and sparsely punctate.
