= Trochalus longicornis =

Scientific classification
- Kingdom: Animalia
- Phylum: Arthropoda
- Clade: Pancrustacea
- Class: Insecta
- Order: Coleoptera
- Suborder: Polyphaga
- Infraorder: Scarabaeiformia
- Family: Scarabaeidae
- Genus: Trochalus
- Species: T. longicornis

Binomial name
- Trochalus longicornis Moser, 1924

Species of beetle

Trochalus longicornis is a species of beetle of the family Scarabaeidae. It is found in Tanzania.

== Description ==
Adults reach a length of about 7 mm (0.28 in). They are similar to Trochalus byrrhinus and may be distinguished by the fact that the male antennal fan is significantly longer and slightly curved.
