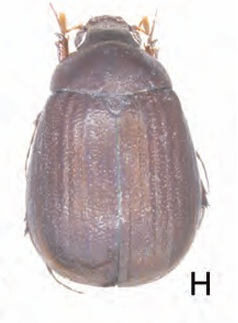

Scientific classification
- Kingdom: Animalia
- Phylum: Arthropoda
- Class: Insecta
- Order: Coleoptera
- Suborder: Polyphaga
- Infraorder: Scarabaeiformia
- Family: Scarabaeidae
- Genus: Maladera
- Species: M. trochaloides

Binomial name
- Maladera trochaloides Ahrens & Fabrizi, 2016

= Maladera trochaloides =

Species of beetle

Maladera trochaloides is a species of beetle of the family Scarabaeidae. It is found in India (Tamil Nadu).

== Description ==
Adults reach a length of about 8.8–9.7 mm. They have a dark reddish brown, oval body. The dorsal and ventral surface are dull, the former, except for the lateral setae of the elytra and pronotum, nearly glabrous.

== Etymology ==
The species name is derived from the combined Sericini genus name Trochalus and the Greek suffix -oides (meaning resembling) and refers to the round body shape which is similar to the African Trochalus species.
