= Trochalus kwiluensis =

Scientific classification
- Kingdom: Animalia
- Phylum: Arthropoda
- Clade: Pancrustacea
- Class: Insecta
- Order: Coleoptera
- Suborder: Polyphaga
- Infraorder: Scarabaeiformia
- Family: Scarabaeidae
- Genus: Trochalus
- Species: T. kwiluensis

Binomial name
- Trochalus kwiluensis Moser, 1924

Species of beetle

Trochalus kwiluensis is a species of beetle of the family Scarabaeidae. It is found in the Democratic Republic of the Congo.

== Description ==
Adults reach a length of about 7 mm (0.28 in). They are similar to Trochalus opaculus. They are blackish-brown above, but brown and opaque below, with the legs shiny. The head is moderately closely punctured in the middle and the clypeus is lightly longitudinally carinate in the center. The antennae are reddish-yellow. The prothorax dorsal surface is densely punctured and bears a few setae behind the front margin and behind the front angles. The elytra have rows of punctures, with the flat interstices covered in fairly dense punctures. The pygidium is moderately closely punctured.
