= Trochalus maynei =

Scientific classification
- Kingdom: Animalia
- Phylum: Arthropoda
- Clade: Pancrustacea
- Class: Insecta
- Order: Coleoptera
- Suborder: Polyphaga
- Infraorder: Scarabaeiformia
- Family: Scarabaeidae
- Genus: Trochalus
- Species: T. maynei

Binomial name
- Trochalus maynei Moser, 1924

Species of beetle

Trochalus maynei is a species of beetle of the family Scarabaeidae. It is found in the Democratic Republic of the Congo.

== Description ==
Adults reach a length of about 6 mm (0.24 in). They are similar to Trochalus pilula. They are shining, black above, and dark brown beneath. The head is fairly strongly punctate and the antennae are reddish-yellow. The elytra have indistinct rows of punctures, with the interstices flat. They are covered with fairly dense punctures. The pygidium is moderately closely marked with ring-like punctures.
