= Trochalus picipes =

Scientific classification
- Kingdom: Animalia
- Phylum: Arthropoda
- Class: Insecta
- Order: Coleoptera
- Suborder: Polyphaga
- Infraorder: Scarabaeiformia
- Family: Scarabaeidae
- Genus: Trochalus
- Species: T. picipes

Binomial name
- Trochalus picipes Klug, 1855

Species of beetle

Trochalus picipes is a species of beetle of the family Scarabaeidae. It is found in Mozambique.

== Description ==
They are globose and fuscous-black, with the legs piceous. The upper side is deep dark brown, almost black, and without sheen. The head and prothorax are densely and the elytra scarcely visibly punctured, the latter indistinctly striate. The under side is dark piceous-brown.
