= Trochalus viridicollis =

Scientific classification
- Kingdom: Animalia
- Phylum: Arthropoda
- Clade: Pancrustacea
- Class: Insecta
- Order: Coleoptera
- Suborder: Polyphaga
- Infraorder: Scarabaeiformia
- Family: Scarabaeidae
- Genus: Trochalus
- Species: T. viridicollis

Binomial name
- Trochalus viridicollis Moser, 1916

Species of beetle

Trochalus viridicollis is a species of beetle of the family Scarabaeidae. It is found in the Democratic Republic of the Congo.

== Description ==
Adults reach a length of about 6 mm. They are black, the head and pronotum with a green shimmer. The head is strongly punctate and the antennae are yellowish-brown. The pronotum is densely and rather strongly punctate, with a more or less distinct small smooth longitudinal spot in the middle. The anterior margin and the lateral margins are finely setate, the former with setae in the middle.
