= Trochalus endroedii =

Scientific classification
- Kingdom: Animalia
- Phylum: Arthropoda
- Clade: Pancrustacea
- Class: Insecta
- Order: Coleoptera
- Suborder: Polyphaga
- Infraorder: Scarabaeiformia
- Family: Scarabaeidae
- Genus: Trochalus
- Species: T. endroedii

Binomial name
- Trochalus endroedii Frey, 1974

Species of beetle

Trochalus endroedii is a species of beetle of the family Scarabaeidae. It is found in Ghana.

== Description ==
Adults reach a length of about 5-5.5 mm. The upper and lower surfaces are light reddish-brown and shiny. The antennae are yellow. The pronotum is densely and finely punctate and the elytra are less sparsely, but similarly punctate.
