= Trochalus imitans =

Scientific classification
- Kingdom: Animalia
- Phylum: Arthropoda
- Clade: Pancrustacea
- Class: Insecta
- Order: Coleoptera
- Suborder: Polyphaga
- Infraorder: Scarabaeiformia
- Family: Scarabaeidae
- Genus: Trochalus
- Species: T. imitans

Binomial name
- Trochalus imitans Frey, 1962

Species of beetle

Trochalus imitans is a species of beetle of the family Scarabaeidae. It is found in Tanzania.

== Description ==
Adults reach a length of about 6.5–7 mm. They are blackish-brown, with the head, most of the pronotum (except for a semi-circular area in front of the scutellum), the anterior lateral part of the elytra, as well as the entire underside and the legs glossy. The remainder is dull.
