= Trochalus piceolus =

Scientific classification
- Kingdom: Animalia
- Phylum: Arthropoda
- Clade: Pancrustacea
- Class: Insecta
- Order: Coleoptera
- Suborder: Polyphaga
- Infraorder: Scarabaeiformia
- Family: Scarabaeidae
- Genus: Trochalus
- Species: T. piceolus

Binomial name
- Trochalus piceolus Moser, 1917

Species of beetle

Trochalus piceolus is a species of beetle of the family Scarabaeidae. It is found in Tanzania.

== Description ==
Adults reach a length of about 6 mm. The head is moderately densely punctured and the antennae are yellow. The pronotum is densely punctate, with several setae both along the anterior margin and laterally next to the anterior angles. On the elytra, the rows of punctures are very indistinct, and the punctures are quite close together in the shallow interstices.
