= Trochalus diversirostris =

Scientific classification
- Kingdom: Animalia
- Phylum: Arthropoda
- Clade: Pancrustacea
- Class: Insecta
- Order: Coleoptera
- Suborder: Polyphaga
- Infraorder: Scarabaeiformia
- Family: Scarabaeidae
- Genus: Trochalus
- Species: T. diversirostris

Binomial name
- Trochalus diversirostris Frey, 1963

Species of beetle

Trochalus diversirostris is a species of beetle of the family Scarabaeidae. It is found in South Africa (KwaZulu-Natal).

== Description ==
Adults reach a length of about 7.5–8 mm. They have a reddish-brown to dark reddish-brown, compact body. The upper and lower surfaces are smooth, with only a thin row of short hairs on the ventral segments (apart from the legs). The clypeus is evenly and finely punctate, while the frons and vertex are considerably more densely and somewhat unevenly punctate. The pronotum is densely, evenly, and finely punctate, as is the scutellum. The elytra and pygidium are punctate like the clypeus. The antennae are light brown.
