= Trochalus conspicuus =

Scientific classification
- Kingdom: Animalia
- Phylum: Arthropoda
- Clade: Pancrustacea
- Class: Insecta
- Order: Coleoptera
- Suborder: Polyphaga
- Infraorder: Scarabaeiformia
- Family: Scarabaeidae
- Genus: Trochalus
- Species: T. conspicuus

Binomial name
- Trochalus conspicuus Moser, 1919

Species of beetle

Trochalus conspicuus is a species of beetle of the family Scarabaeidae. It is found in Tanzania.

== Description ==
Adults reach a length of about 10–11 mm. They are similar to Trochalus excellens. They are reddish-brown and silky shiny. The frons is densely punctate and the punctation on the clypeus is slightly wrinkled. The pronotum is similarly shaped to that of excellens and its surface moderately densely covered with fine punctures. The elytra have rows of punctures, the intervals with weakly wrinkled punctation. The first and third intervals are wider than the others. The pygidium is more or less densely covered with umbilical punctures.
