= Trochalus guineensis =

Scientific classification
- Kingdom: Animalia
- Phylum: Arthropoda
- Clade: Pancrustacea
- Class: Insecta
- Order: Coleoptera
- Suborder: Polyphaga
- Infraorder: Scarabaeiformia
- Family: Scarabaeidae
- Genus: Trochalus
- Species: T. guineensis

Binomial name
- Trochalus guineensis Frey, 1973

Species of beetle

Trochalus guineensis is a species of beetle of the family Scarabaeidae. It is found in Guinea-Bissau.

== Description ==
Adults reach a length of about 6–7 mm. The upper surface is blackish-brown, dull and tomentose, while the head is shiny. The underside is somewhat lighter. The pronotum and elytra are densely and rather finely punctured, the latter with faint striae.
