= Trochalus kochi =

Scientific classification
- Kingdom: Animalia
- Phylum: Arthropoda
- Clade: Pancrustacea
- Class: Insecta
- Order: Coleoptera
- Suborder: Polyphaga
- Infraorder: Scarabaeiformia
- Family: Scarabaeidae
- Genus: Trochalus
- Species: T. kochi

Binomial name
- Trochalus kochi Frey, 1968

Species of beetle

Trochalus kochi is a species of beetle of the family Scarabaeidae. It is found in South Africa (Limpopo).

== Description ==
Adults reach a length of about 7–8 mm. The upper and lower surfaces are dark reddish-brown. The body is long and oval. The frons and vertex are finely, rather densely punctate with smooth areas. The pronotum is very densely punctate. The elytra are also densely punctate, with distinct striae.
