= Trochalus tomentosus =

Scientific classification
- Kingdom: Animalia
- Phylum: Arthropoda
- Clade: Pancrustacea
- Class: Insecta
- Order: Coleoptera
- Suborder: Polyphaga
- Infraorder: Scarabaeiformia
- Family: Scarabaeidae
- Genus: Trochalus
- Species: T. tomentosus

Binomial name
- Trochalus tomentosus Moser, 1917

Species of beetle

Trochalus tomentosus is a species of beetle of the family Scarabaeidae. It is found in Gabon and Cameroon.

== Description ==
Adults reach a length of about 8-8.5 mm. They are blackish-brown and dull, the upper surface sometimes with a faint olive sheen. The head is sparsely punctate. The pronotum is densely and finely punctate, with yellow setae along the lateral and anterior margins, and also isolated setae in the anterior part of the disc. The elytra have indistinct rows of punctures, with the shallow intervals quite densely covered with punctures.
