= Trochalus cariniger =

Scientific classification
- Kingdom: Animalia
- Phylum: Arthropoda
- Clade: Pancrustacea
- Class: Insecta
- Order: Coleoptera
- Suborder: Polyphaga
- Infraorder: Scarabaeiformia
- Family: Scarabaeidae
- Genus: Trochalus
- Species: T. cariniger

Binomial name
- Trochalus cariniger Kolbe, 1914

Species of beetle

Trochalus cariniger is a species of beetle of the family Scarabaeidae. It is found in Tanzania.

== Description ==
Adults reach a length of about 8–9 mm (0.31–0.35 in). They have an oblong-oval, brown body. They are mostly dull above, while the head, the greater part of the pronotum and the humeral callus of the elytra are smooth and shiny, with the pronotum somewhat iridescent. They are mostly shiny below.
