= Trochalus bailundensis =

Scientific classification
- Kingdom: Animalia
- Phylum: Arthropoda
- Clade: Pancrustacea
- Class: Insecta
- Order: Coleoptera
- Suborder: Polyphaga
- Infraorder: Scarabaeiformia
- Family: Scarabaeidae
- Genus: Trochalus
- Species: T. bailundensis

Binomial name
- Trochalus bailundensis Moser, 1920

Species of beetle

Trochalus bailundensis is a species of beetle of the family Scarabaeidae. It is found in Angola.

== Description ==
Adults reach a length of about 8 mm. They are reddish-brown and shiny. There is coarse punctation on the pronotum and elytra.
