= Trochalus ealanus =

Scientific classification
- Kingdom: Animalia
- Phylum: Arthropoda
- Clade: Pancrustacea
- Class: Insecta
- Order: Coleoptera
- Suborder: Polyphaga
- Infraorder: Scarabaeiformia
- Family: Scarabaeidae
- Genus: Trochalus
- Species: T. ealanus

Binomial name
- Trochalus ealanus Moser, 1924

Species of beetle

Trochalus ealanus is a species of beetle of the family Scarabaeidae. It is found in the Democratic Republic of the Congo.

== Description ==
Adults reach a length of about 7.5 mm (0.30 in). They are similar to Trochalus pilula. They are shining, black above, and dark brown below. The head is rather sparsely punctate and the antennae are reddish-yellow. The elytra have indistinct rows of punctures, with the intervals flat and bearing fairly close-set punctures. The pygidium is moderately densely punctate.
