= Trochalus beiranus =

Scientific classification
- Kingdom: Animalia
- Phylum: Arthropoda
- Clade: Pancrustacea
- Class: Insecta
- Order: Coleoptera
- Suborder: Polyphaga
- Infraorder: Scarabaeiformia
- Family: Scarabaeidae
- Genus: Trochalus
- Species: T. beiranus

Binomial name
- Trochalus beiranus Frey, 1964

Species of beetle

Trochalus beiranus is a species of beetle of the family Scarabaeidae. It is found in Mozambique.

== Description ==
Adults reach a length of about 6.5–7 mm. The upper surface is blackish-brown, while the underside and legs are brown and the antennae are yellow. The head (including the clypeus) is rather densely and coarsely punctate. The pronotum, elytra and scutellum are similarly densely but evenly punctate.
