= Trochalus alternans =

Scientific classification
- Kingdom: Animalia
- Phylum: Arthropoda
- Clade: Pancrustacea
- Class: Insecta
- Order: Coleoptera
- Suborder: Polyphaga
- Infraorder: Scarabaeiformia
- Family: Scarabaeidae
- Genus: Trochalus
- Species: T. alternans

Binomial name
- Trochalus alternans (Frey, 1960)

Synonyms
- Epitrochalus alternans Frey, 1960

Species of beetle

Trochalus alternans is a species of beetle of the family Scarabaeidae. It is found in Namibia.

== Description ==
Adults reach a length of about 9-9.5 mm. The head and underside are light brown and the pronotum and elytra are dark shiny brown. Both the upper and underside are smooth (except for the marginal setae on the posterior body segments). The surface of the pronotum and elytra is densely and rather coarsely punctate.
