= Trochalus heterosternus =

Scientific classification
- Kingdom: Animalia
- Phylum: Arthropoda
- Clade: Pancrustacea
- Class: Insecta
- Order: Coleoptera
- Suborder: Polyphaga
- Infraorder: Scarabaeiformia
- Family: Scarabaeidae
- Genus: Trochalus
- Species: T. heterosternus

Binomial name
- Trochalus heterosternus Moser, 1917

Species of beetle

Trochalus heterosternus is a species of beetle of the family Scarabaeidae. It is found in Cameroon.

== Description ==
Adults reach a length of about 7.5–8 mm. They are blackish-brown and dull. The upper surface is pruinose, and the middle of the thorax and the legs are shiny. The head is shiny except for the dull vertex, and there is a transverse groove between the eyes. The punctation of the head is strong and dense, the space behind the anterior margin is smooth. The antennae are reddish-yellow. The pronotum is densely and finely punctate and the elytra have rather closely spaced, minutely setose punctures. Rows of punctures are not discernible, but darker longitudinal lines are.
