= Trochalus fulgidus =

Scientific classification
- Kingdom: Animalia
- Phylum: Arthropoda
- Class: Insecta
- Order: Coleoptera
- Suborder: Polyphaga
- Infraorder: Scarabaeiformia
- Family: Scarabaeidae
- Genus: Trochalus
- Species: T. fulgidus

Binomial name
- Trochalus fulgidus Fåhraeus, 1857

Species of beetle

Trochalus fulgidus is a species of beetle of the family Scarabaeidae. It is found in South Africa (KwaZulu-Natal) and Mozambique.

== Description ==
Adults reach a length of about 6–7 mm. They have a chestnut-red or dark bronze, shiny, moderately iridescent, strongly ovate body. The antennae are rufescent.
