= Trochalus lamtoensis =

Scientific classification
- Kingdom: Animalia
- Phylum: Arthropoda
- Clade: Pancrustacea
- Class: Insecta
- Order: Coleoptera
- Suborder: Polyphaga
- Infraorder: Scarabaeiformia
- Family: Scarabaeidae
- Genus: Trochalus
- Species: T. lamtoensis

Binomial name
- Trochalus lamtoensis Frey, 1970

Species of beetle

Trochalus lamtoensis is a species of beetle of the family Scarabaeidae. It is found in Ivory Coast.

== Description ==
Adults reach a length of about 8 mm. The upper and lower surfaces are reddish-brown and dull. The antennae are yellow. The clypeus and frons are shiny and the former is rather densely and finely punctate with a smooth midline. The pronotum and elytra are very strongly tomentose. A dense punctation is only very indistinctly visible on the pronotum (the elytra lack distinct punctation).
