= Trochalus simplex =

Scientific classification
- Kingdom: Animalia
- Phylum: Arthropoda
- Clade: Pancrustacea
- Class: Insecta
- Order: Coleoptera
- Suborder: Polyphaga
- Infraorder: Scarabaeiformia
- Family: Scarabaeidae
- Genus: Trochalus
- Species: T. simplex

Binomial name
- Trochalus simplex Frey, 1973

Species of beetle

Trochalus simplex is a species of beetle of the family Scarabaeidae. It is found in Guinea.

== Description ==
Adults reach a length of about 5 mm. They are dark reddish-brown, moderately shiny and smooth on both the upper and lower surfaces. The upper surface of the clypeus is densely and moderately coarsely punctate. The rest of the head, pronotum, scutellum, and elytra is uniformly much more finely and less densely punctate than the clypeus.
