= Trochalus pruinosus =

Scientific classification
- Kingdom: Animalia
- Phylum: Arthropoda
- Clade: Pancrustacea
- Class: Insecta
- Order: Coleoptera
- Suborder: Polyphaga
- Infraorder: Scarabaeiformia
- Family: Scarabaeidae
- Genus: Trochalus
- Species: T. pruinosus

Binomial name
- Trochalus pruinosus Kolbe, 1914

Species of beetle

Trochalus pruinosus is a species of beetle of the family Scarabaeidae. It is found in Tanzania.

== Description ==
Adults reach a length of about 8.5 mm (0.33 in). The upper surface is dark brown, pruinose and mostly dull (only the head is glossy). The pronotum is of the usual shape, but the anterior angles are very pointed, and the lateral margins in front of the anterior and posterior angles somewhat indented. The entire upper surface rather densely and finely punctate. The elytra are distinctly punctate-striate, but the striae are weak. The legs are partly dull, with the hind legs entirely glossy. The underside is dull and somewhat pruinose.
