= Trochalus cariniceps =

Scientific classification
- Kingdom: Animalia
- Phylum: Arthropoda
- Clade: Pancrustacea
- Class: Insecta
- Order: Coleoptera
- Suborder: Polyphaga
- Infraorder: Scarabaeiformia
- Family: Scarabaeidae
- Genus: Trochalus
- Species: T. cariniceps

Binomial name
- Trochalus cariniceps Kolbe, 1914

Species of beetle

Trochalus cariniceps is a species of beetle of the family Scarabaeidae. It is found in Rwanda and Burundi.

== Description ==
Adults reach a length of about 9.5 mm (0.37 in). They have an egg-shaped, dull brown body, but the head is entirely glossy. The pronotum is shiny at the frontal part and along the sides. The underside and legs are very glossy. The pronotum is somewhat rounded laterally, and fairly densely and finely punctate. The anterior angles long and pointed, and the posterior angles are obtuse. The elytra are weakly striated, the striae more distinct and somewhat deepened posteriorly, the sutural striae distinct anteriorly. The pygidium is abundantly and finely punctate.
