= Trochalus lucens =

Scientific classification
- Kingdom: Animalia
- Phylum: Arthropoda
- Clade: Pancrustacea
- Class: Insecta
- Order: Coleoptera
- Suborder: Polyphaga
- Infraorder: Scarabaeiformia
- Family: Scarabaeidae
- Genus: Trochalus
- Species: T. lucens

Binomial name
- Trochalus lucens Frey, 1970

Species of beetle

Trochalus lucens is a species of beetle of the family Scarabaeidae. It is found in Ivory Coast.

== Description ==
Adults reach a length of about 6 mm. The upper and lower surfaces are reddish-brown (but the antennae are yellow), shiny and glabrous. The upper surface of the clypeus is moderately densely and rather finely punctate. The pronotum is densely and finely punctate, while the elytra are closely punctate, with the striae barely visible.
