= Trochalus iridescens =

Scientific classification
- Kingdom: Animalia
- Phylum: Arthropoda
- Clade: Pancrustacea
- Class: Insecta
- Order: Coleoptera
- Suborder: Polyphaga
- Infraorder: Scarabaeiformia
- Family: Scarabaeidae
- Genus: Trochalus
- Species: T. iridescens

Binomial name
- Trochalus iridescens Frey, 1968

Species of beetle

Trochalus iridescens is a species of beetle of the family Scarabaeidae. It is found in Zambia.

== Description ==
Adults reach a length of about 8–9 mm. The upper and lower surfaces are dark reddish-brown and shiny and the elytra are strongly iridescent. The upper surface of the clypeus (except for the smooth anterior margin, which bears only a double row of fine punctures at its uppermost boundary) is densely but not very coarsely punctured. The frons and vertex are moderately and densely punctured (except for the almost smooth posterior margin). The pronotum is densely punctured and the elytra are punctured somewhat more coarsely than the pronotum.
