= Trochalus fuscipes =

Scientific classification
- Kingdom: Animalia
- Phylum: Arthropoda
- Clade: Pancrustacea
- Class: Insecta
- Order: Coleoptera
- Suborder: Polyphaga
- Infraorder: Scarabaeiformia
- Family: Scarabaeidae
- Genus: Trochalus
- Species: T. fuscipes

Binomial name
- Trochalus fuscipes Moser, 1917

Species of beetle

Trochalus fuscipes is a species of beetle of the family Scarabaeidae. It is found in Togo.

== Description ==
Adults reach a length of about 8 mm. They are blackish-brown and shiny, with reddish-brown legs. The frons is sparsely punctured and the antennae are yellowish-brown. The pronotum is fairly densely covered with fine punctures and the elytra have rows of punctures, with the intervals moderately densely punctured.
