= Trochalus similis =

Scientific classification
- Kingdom: Animalia
- Phylum: Arthropoda
- Clade: Pancrustacea
- Class: Insecta
- Order: Coleoptera
- Suborder: Polyphaga
- Infraorder: Scarabaeiformia
- Family: Scarabaeidae
- Genus: Trochalus
- Species: T. similis

Binomial name
- Trochalus similis Frey, 1968

Species of beetle

Trochalus similis is a species of beetle of the family Scarabaeidae. It is found in the Republic of the Congo.

== Description ==
The upper surface is blackish-brown, while the underside and pygidium are brown and the antennae are light brown. The head and two-thirds of the pronotum are shiny, while the remaining upper surface is dull and slightly tomentose.
