= Trochalus bonsae =

Scientific classification
- Kingdom: Animalia
- Phylum: Arthropoda
- Clade: Pancrustacea
- Class: Insecta
- Order: Coleoptera
- Suborder: Polyphaga
- Infraorder: Scarabaeiformia
- Family: Scarabaeidae
- Genus: Trochalus
- Species: T. bonsae

Binomial name
- Trochalus bonsae Frey, 1970

Species of beetle

Trochalus bonsae is a species of beetle of the family Scarabaeidae. It is found in Ivory Coast.

== Description ==
Adults reach a length of about 6.5–7 mm. The upper surface is reddish-brown and dull, while the underside is brown, with the ventral segments dull. Next to the sutural stripe, the coloration is usually somewhat darker. The clypeus and frons are shiny, while the rest of the upper surface is dull. The pronotum is very tomentose and very finely and densely punctate. The elytra are less tomentate and weakly striated, with the intervals moderately densely and finely punctate.
