= Trochalus insignis =

Scientific classification
- Kingdom: Animalia
- Phylum: Arthropoda
- Clade: Pancrustacea
- Class: Insecta
- Order: Coleoptera
- Suborder: Polyphaga
- Infraorder: Scarabaeiformia
- Family: Scarabaeidae
- Genus: Trochalus
- Species: T. insignis

Binomial name
- Trochalus insignis Moser, 1918

Species of beetle

Trochalus insignis is a species of beetle of the family Scarabaeidae. It is found in Namibia.

== Description ==
Adults reach a length of about 8 mm. They are reddish-brown and shiny and the antennae are reddish-yellow. The pronotum is densely punctate and the elytra show only indistinct rows of punctures, with the intervals quite densely punctate.
