= Trochalus inops =

Scientific classification
- Kingdom: Animalia
- Phylum: Arthropoda
- Class: Insecta
- Order: Coleoptera
- Suborder: Polyphaga
- Infraorder: Scarabaeiformia
- Family: Scarabaeidae
- Genus: Trochalus
- Species: T. inops

Binomial name
- Trochalus inops Péringuey, 1904

Species of beetle

Trochalus inops is a species of beetle of the family Scarabaeidae. It is found in Namibia and Zimbabwe.

== Description ==
Adults reach a length of about 5–6 mm. They are chestnut-brown, shining and iridescent. The antennae are flavescent, except for the two basal joints of the pedicel, which are sub-ferruginous. They have a plainly ovate body.
