= Trochalus orbiculatus =

Scientific classification
- Kingdom: Animalia
- Phylum: Arthropoda
- Class: Insecta
- Order: Coleoptera
- Suborder: Polyphaga
- Infraorder: Scarabaeiformia
- Family: Scarabaeidae
- Genus: Trochalus
- Species: T. orbiculatus

Binomial name
- Trochalus orbiculatus Péringuey, 1904

Species of beetle

Trochalus orbiculatus is a species of beetle of the family Scarabaeidae. It is found in Zimbabwe and South Africa (Mpumalanga, Limpopo).

== Description ==
Adults reach a length of about 6.5–6.75 mm. They have an almost orbiculate, but not very much convex body. They are chestnut-brown or somewhat dark bronze and opaque. The antennae are flavous.
