= Trochalus nigropiceus =

Scientific classification
- Kingdom: Animalia
- Phylum: Arthropoda
- Clade: Pancrustacea
- Class: Insecta
- Order: Coleoptera
- Suborder: Polyphaga
- Infraorder: Scarabaeiformia
- Family: Scarabaeidae
- Genus: Trochalus
- Species: T. nigropiceus

Binomial name
- Trochalus nigropiceus Moser, 1917

Species of beetle

Trochalus nigropiceus is a species of beetle of the family Scarabaeidae. It is found in Tanzania.

== Description ==
Adults reach a length of about 6 mm. They are blackish-brown and shiny. The head is rather densely punctate and the antennae are yellow. The pronotum is densely and rather strongly punctate, with some yellowish setae behind the anterior angles. The elytra have indistinct rows of punctures, with the intervals rather densely punctate.
