= Trochalus mwikanus =

Scientific classification
- Kingdom: Animalia
- Phylum: Arthropoda
- Clade: Pancrustacea
- Class: Insecta
- Order: Coleoptera
- Suborder: Polyphaga
- Infraorder: Scarabaeiformia
- Family: Scarabaeidae
- Genus: Trochalus
- Species: T. mwikanus

Binomial name
- Trochalus mwikanus Moser, 1924

Species of beetle

Trochalus mwikanus is a species of beetle of the family Scarabaeidae. It is found in Tanzania.

== Description ==
Adults reach a length of about 8.5 mm (0.33 in). They have an oblong-oval body. They are dark above, while the underside is reddish-brown and shiny. The head is quite densely punctate, with reddish-yellow antennae.
