= Trochalus crampelanus =

Scientific classification
- Kingdom: Animalia
- Phylum: Arthropoda
- Clade: Pancrustacea
- Class: Insecta
- Order: Coleoptera
- Suborder: Polyphaga
- Infraorder: Scarabaeiformia
- Family: Scarabaeidae
- Genus: Trochalus
- Species: T. crampelanus

Binomial name
- Trochalus crampelanus Moser, 1917

Species of beetle

Trochalus crampelanus is a species of beetle of the family Scarabaeidae. It is found in western Africa and the Central African Republic.

== Description ==
Adults reach a length of about 7.5 mm. They are dull, blackish-brown above and brown below, and the middle of the thorax and the legs are shiny. The head is smooth behind the anterior margin, the vertex is dull and the antennae are reddish-yellow, with a yellow club. The pronotum is densely punctate and the punctures on the elytra are quite close together. Rows of punctures are not visible, only faint longitudinal lines. Next to the sides of the elytra, there are a few small yellow setae.
