= Trochalus zambesianus =

Scientific classification
- Kingdom: Animalia
- Phylum: Arthropoda
- Clade: Pancrustacea
- Class: Insecta
- Order: Coleoptera
- Suborder: Polyphaga
- Infraorder: Scarabaeiformia
- Family: Scarabaeidae
- Genus: Trochalus
- Species: T. zambesianus

Binomial name
- Trochalus zambesianus Moser, 1924

Species of beetle

Trochalus zambesianus is a species of beetle of the family Scarabaeidae. It is found in eastern Africa, where it was reported from an area close to the Zambesi river.

== Description ==
Adults reach a length of about 7 mm (0.28 in). They have an oblong-oval, dark, shiny body. The antennae are rust-coloured, with a yellow club. The pronotum, scutellum and elytra are densely punctured, while the pygidium is densely punctured only in the middle.
