= Trochalus bituberculatus =

Scientific classification
- Kingdom: Animalia
- Phylum: Arthropoda
- Clade: Pancrustacea
- Class: Insecta
- Order: Coleoptera
- Suborder: Polyphaga
- Infraorder: Scarabaeiformia
- Family: Scarabaeidae
- Genus: Trochalus
- Species: T. bituberculatus

Binomial name
- Trochalus bituberculatus Moser, 1916

Species of beetle

Trochalus bituberculatus is a species of beetle of the family Scarabaeidae. It is found in the Democratic Republic of the Congo.

== Description ==
Adults reach a length of about 6 mm. They are reddish-brown and shiny. The head is rather sparsely punctate and the antennae are yellowish-brown. The pronotum is moderately densely punctate and the elytra have indistinct rows of punctures, with the shallow intervals moderately densely covered with punctures.
