= Trochalus camerunensis =

Scientific classification
- Kingdom: Animalia
- Phylum: Arthropoda
- Clade: Pancrustacea
- Class: Insecta
- Order: Coleoptera
- Suborder: Polyphaga
- Infraorder: Scarabaeiformia
- Family: Scarabaeidae
- Genus: Trochalus
- Species: T. camerunensis

Binomial name
- Trochalus camerunensis Brenske, 1903

Species of beetle

Trochalus camerunensis is a species of beetle of the family Scarabaeidae. It is found in Cameroon, Ghana, the Democratic Republic of the Congo and the Republic of the Congo.

== Description ==
Adults reach a length of about 9 mm (0.35 in). They have an egg-shaped body. They are black and densely tomentose above, but blackish-brown and glossy on the underside. The pronotum is densely punctate, with the sides almost straight, and the hind margin slightly rounded. The scutellum is broad at the base and the elytra are finely punctate in rows. The rows of punctures are slightly impressed, and the intervals are not densely punctate.
