= Trochalus brevipes =

Scientific classification
- Kingdom: Animalia
- Phylum: Arthropoda
- Clade: Pancrustacea
- Class: Insecta
- Order: Coleoptera
- Suborder: Polyphaga
- Infraorder: Scarabaeiformia
- Family: Scarabaeidae
- Genus: Trochalus
- Species: T. brevipes

Binomial name
- Trochalus brevipes Moser, 1917

Species of beetle

Trochalus brevipes is a species of beetle of the family Scarabaeidae. It is found in Benin.

== Description ==
Adults reach a length of about 8 mm. They are blackish-brown and dull. The antennae are yellowish-brown. The pronotum has dense and weak punctation, and the anterior margin and the lateral margins are covered with fine yellow setae. The elytra have regular rows of punctures, with the intervals flat and rather densely punctate.
