= Trochalus integriceps =

Scientific classification
- Kingdom: Animalia
- Phylum: Arthropoda
- Clade: Pancrustacea
- Class: Insecta
- Order: Coleoptera
- Suborder: Polyphaga
- Infraorder: Scarabaeiformia
- Family: Scarabaeidae
- Genus: Trochalus
- Species: T. integriceps

Binomial name
- Trochalus integriceps Moser, 1917

Species of beetle

Trochalus integriceps is a species of beetle of the family Scarabaeidae. It is found in Benin, Cameroon, Ivory Coast and Guinea.

== Description ==
Adults reach a length of about 6–7 mm. They are brown or blackish-brown and dull, while the middle of the thorax and the legs are shiny. The frons is strongly and rather densely punctate and the antennae are yellowish-brown. The pronotum is densely and finely punctate and the anterior margin and the lateral margins have fine yellow setae. The elytra have indistinct rows of punctures, with the intervals flat and rather densely punctured.
