= Trochalus pondoensis =

Scientific classification
- Kingdom: Animalia
- Phylum: Arthropoda
- Clade: Pancrustacea
- Class: Insecta
- Order: Coleoptera
- Suborder: Polyphaga
- Infraorder: Scarabaeiformia
- Family: Scarabaeidae
- Genus: Trochalus
- Species: T. pondoensis

Binomial name
- Trochalus pondoensis Frey, 1968

Species of beetle

Trochalus pondoensis is a species of beetle of the family Scarabaeidae. It is found in South Africa (Eastern Cape).

== Description ==
Adults reach a length of about 7 mm. They have a short, egg-shaped body. The upper and lower surfaces are shiny blackish-brown. The frons, vertex and pronotum are densely, but finely punctate, while the elytra are somewhat more coarsely, but also densely punctate.
