= Trochalus malelanus =

Scientific classification
- Kingdom: Animalia
- Phylum: Arthropoda
- Clade: Pancrustacea
- Class: Insecta
- Order: Coleoptera
- Suborder: Polyphaga
- Infraorder: Scarabaeiformia
- Family: Scarabaeidae
- Genus: Trochalus
- Species: T. malelanus

Binomial name
- Trochalus malelanus Moser, 1916

Species of beetle

Trochalus malelanus is a species of beetle of the family Scarabaeidae. It is found in the Democratic Republic of the Congo.

== Description ==
Adults reach a length of about 8 mm. They are blackish-brown and dull, although the legs are shiny and reddish-brown. The head is robustly, but not densely punctured. The pronotum is densely and finely punctured and the lateral margins and the anterior margin are covered with some setae. The punctures on the elytra are quite close together and have tiny setae.
