= Trochalus lepidus =

Scientific classification
- Kingdom: Animalia
- Phylum: Arthropoda
- Class: Insecta
- Order: Coleoptera
- Suborder: Polyphaga
- Infraorder: Scarabaeiformia
- Family: Scarabaeidae
- Genus: Trochalus
- Species: T. lepidus

Binomial name
- Trochalus lepidus Péringuey, 1904

Species of beetle

Trochalus lepidus is a species of beetle of the family Scarabaeidae. It is found in South Africa (Mpumalanga).

== Description ==
Adults reach a length of about 6-6.5 mm. They are bronze-green, with the elytra brownish-red or partly rufescent. They are opaque on the upper side, and occasionally sub-iridescent. The antennae are flavous.
