= Trochalus piceus =

Scientific classification
- Kingdom: Animalia
- Phylum: Arthropoda
- Clade: Pancrustacea
- Class: Insecta
- Order: Coleoptera
- Suborder: Polyphaga
- Infraorder: Scarabaeiformia
- Family: Scarabaeidae
- Genus: Trochalus
- Species: T. piceus

Binomial name
- Trochalus piceus (Fabricius, 1781)

Synonyms
- Melolontha picea Fabricius, 1781; Melolontha picatus Gmelin, 1790

Species of beetle

Trochalus piceus is a species of beetle of the family Scarabaeidae. It is found in South Africa.

== Description ==
They are vivid brown, sometimes paler, sometimes darker, and with a strong bronze sheen. They are densely and finely punctate. The elytra are very weakly striate, the sutural stria is more marked than the others.
