= Trochalus monticola =

Scientific classification
- Kingdom: Animalia
- Phylum: Arthropoda
- Clade: Pancrustacea
- Class: Insecta
- Order: Coleoptera
- Suborder: Polyphaga
- Infraorder: Scarabaeiformia
- Family: Scarabaeidae
- Genus: Trochalus
- Species: T. monticola

Binomial name
- Trochalus monticola Frey, 1974

Species of beetle

Trochalus monticola is a species of beetle of the family Scarabaeidae. It is found in Tanzania.

== Description ==
Adults reach a length of about 9 mm. The upper and lower surfaces are reddish-brown, the antennae yellow and the head and pronotum, as well as the marginal part of the elytra are shiny. The base of the pronotum and the remaining part of the elytra only weakly shiny, almost dull. The pronotum is finely and densely punctate. The elytra are very shallowly and sparsely punctate.
