= Trochalus aereus =

Scientific classification
- Kingdom: Animalia
- Phylum: Arthropoda
- Clade: Pancrustacea
- Class: Insecta
- Order: Coleoptera
- Suborder: Polyphaga
- Infraorder: Scarabaeiformia
- Family: Scarabaeidae
- Genus: Trochalus
- Species: T. aereus

Binomial name
- Trochalus aereus Frey, 1970

Synonyms
- Trochalus aereus ab. bicolor Frey, 1970

Species of beetle

Trochalus aereus is a species of beetle of the family Scarabaeidae. It is found in South Africa (Gauteng, KwaZulu-Natal).

== Description ==
Adults reach a length of about 6–8 mm. The upper and lower surfaces are glossy and brown to light brown, the darker parts usually with a metallic sheen. The antennae are yellow. The pronotum is moderately and densely punctate. The elytra have mostly indistinct stripes of punctures, the spaces between these densely and somewhat irregularly punctured.
