= Trochalus urundiensis =

Scientific classification
- Kingdom: Animalia
- Phylum: Arthropoda
- Clade: Pancrustacea
- Class: Insecta
- Order: Coleoptera
- Suborder: Polyphaga
- Infraorder: Scarabaeiformia
- Family: Scarabaeidae
- Genus: Trochalus
- Species: T. urundiensis

Binomial name
- Trochalus urundiensis Moser, 1920

Species of beetle

Trochalus urundiensis is a species of beetle of the family Scarabaeidae. It is found in Burundi.

== Description ==
Adults reach a length of about 8.5 mm. They resemble brown specimens of Trochalus corinthia, but they are a little larger. Furthermore, the pronotum is shorter and almost entirely tomentose.
