= Trochalus modestus =

Scientific classification
- Kingdom: Animalia
- Phylum: Arthropoda
- Class: Insecta
- Order: Coleoptera
- Suborder: Polyphaga
- Infraorder: Scarabaeiformia
- Family: Scarabaeidae
- Genus: Trochalus
- Species: T. modestus

Binomial name
- Trochalus modestus Péringuey, 1892

Species of beetle

Trochalus modestus is a species of beetle of the family Scarabaeidae. It is found in Namibia.

== Description ==
Adults reach a length of about 6.5 mm. They have a testaceous-red, shiny, not iridescent, elongate-ovate body. The antennae are flavescent, with the club very long in males.
