= Trochalus distinctus =

Scientific classification
- Kingdom: Animalia
- Phylum: Arthropoda
- Clade: Pancrustacea
- Class: Insecta
- Order: Coleoptera
- Suborder: Polyphaga
- Infraorder: Scarabaeiformia
- Family: Scarabaeidae
- Genus: Trochalus
- Species: T. distinctus

Binomial name
- Trochalus distinctus Moser, 1918

Species of beetle

Trochalus distinctus is a species of beetle of the family Scarabaeidae. It is found in Angola and the Democratic Republic of the Congo.

== Description ==
Adults reach a length of about 10 mm. They are reddish-brown, tomentose and silky-shimmering above, and shiny below. The head is quite densely punctate and the antennae are yellowish-brown. The pronotum is densely punctured and the elytra have rows of punctures, with the interstices moderately densely punctured, some of which with short setae.
