= Trochalus rugifrons =

Scientific classification
- Kingdom: Animalia
- Phylum: Arthropoda
- Clade: Pancrustacea
- Class: Insecta
- Order: Coleoptera
- Suborder: Polyphaga
- Infraorder: Scarabaeiformia
- Family: Scarabaeidae
- Genus: Trochalus
- Species: T. rugifrons

Binomial name
- Trochalus rugifrons Thomson, 1858

Synonyms
- Trochalus togoensis Moser, 1917; Trochalus verticilineatus Brenske, 1899

Species of beetle

Trochalus rugifrons is a species of beetle of the family Scarabaeidae. It is found in Gabon and the Democratic Republic of the Congo.

== Description ==
Adults reach a length of about 6 mm. They are reddish-brown or blackish-brown and dull. The head is strongly punctured and the frons has a few setae next to the eyes. The antennae are yellowish-brown. The pronotum is densely and finely punctured, the anterior margin covered with yellow setae, and there are also some setae next to the lateral margins. The rows of punctures on the elytra are indistinct, and the intervals are punctured.
