= Trochalus ardoini =

Scientific classification
- Kingdom: Animalia
- Phylum: Arthropoda
- Clade: Pancrustacea
- Class: Insecta
- Order: Coleoptera
- Suborder: Polyphaga
- Infraorder: Scarabaeiformia
- Family: Scarabaeidae
- Genus: Trochalus
- Species: T. ardoini

Binomial name
- Trochalus ardoini Frey, 1968

Species of beetle

Trochalus ardoini is a species of beetle of the family Scarabaeidae. It is found in the Republic of the Congo.

== Description ==
Adults reach a length of about 7 mm. They are dark reddish-brown and shiny. The antennae are yellow. The pronotum, scutellum, and elytra are densely and moderately finely punctate.
