= Trochalus kigonseranus =

Scientific classification
- Kingdom: Animalia
- Phylum: Arthropoda
- Clade: Pancrustacea
- Class: Insecta
- Order: Coleoptera
- Suborder: Polyphaga
- Infraorder: Scarabaeiformia
- Family: Scarabaeidae
- Genus: Trochalus
- Species: T. kigonseranus

Binomial name
- Trochalus kigonseranus Moser, 1919

Species of beetle

Trochalus kigonseranus is a species of beetle of the family Scarabaeidae. It is found in Tanzania.

== Description ==
Adults reach a length of about 8-8.5 mm. They are similar to Trochalus sudanicus. They are glossy and blackish-brown above, and reddish-brown below. The pronotum and scutellum are densely punctate.
