= Trochalus micans =

Scientific classification
- Kingdom: Animalia
- Phylum: Arthropoda
- Clade: Pancrustacea
- Class: Insecta
- Order: Coleoptera
- Suborder: Polyphaga
- Infraorder: Scarabaeiformia
- Family: Scarabaeidae
- Genus: Trochalus
- Species: T. micans

Binomial name
- Trochalus micans Frey, 1974

Species of beetle

Trochalus micans is a species of beetle of the family Scarabaeidae. It is found in Ghana and Guinea.

== Description ==
Adults reach a length of about 7–8 mm. The upper and lower surfaces are dark reddish-brown and shiny. The upper surface is opalescent. The legs are brown and the antennae light brown. The pronotum is densely and finely evenly punctate and the elytra have faintly distinct punctate striae.
