= Trochalus nigerianus =

Scientific classification
- Kingdom: Animalia
- Phylum: Arthropoda
- Clade: Pancrustacea
- Class: Insecta
- Order: Coleoptera
- Suborder: Polyphaga
- Infraorder: Scarabaeiformia
- Family: Scarabaeidae
- Genus: Trochalus
- Species: T. nigerianus

Binomial name
- Trochalus nigerianus Frey, 1960

Species of beetle

Trochalus nigerianus is a species of beetle of the family Scarabaeidae. It is found in Nigeria.

== Description ==
Adults reach a length of about 11.8 mm. They are dark brown, with the head and anterior part of the pronotum moderately shiny. The posterior third of the pronotum and the elytra are almost dull. The underside is shiny and the upper and lower surfaces glabrous, except for the pygidium, which has a few hairs on its posterior margin.
