= Trochalus badius =

Scientific classification
- Kingdom: Animalia
- Phylum: Arthropoda
- Class: Insecta
- Order: Coleoptera
- Suborder: Polyphaga
- Infraorder: Scarabaeiformia
- Family: Scarabaeidae
- Genus: Trochalus
- Species: T. badius

Binomial name
- Trochalus badius Boheman, 1860

Species of beetle

Trochalus badius is a species of beetle of the family Scarabaeidae. It is found in Botswana and Namibia.

== Description ==
Adults reach a length of about 8.5–10 mm. They have a dark chestnut, elongate-ovate, convex body, with a sub-metallic and opaline sheen. The antennae are flavescent.
