= Trochalus fulvicolor =

Scientific classification
- Kingdom: Animalia
- Phylum: Arthropoda
- Clade: Pancrustacea
- Class: Insecta
- Order: Coleoptera
- Suborder: Polyphaga
- Infraorder: Scarabaeiformia
- Family: Scarabaeidae
- Genus: Trochalus
- Species: T. fulvicolor

Binomial name
- Trochalus fulvicolor Moser, 1924

Species of beetle

Trochalus fulvicolor is a species of beetle of the family Scarabaeidae. It is found in the Democratic Republic of the Congo.

== Description ==
Adults reach a length of about 6.5 mm (0.26 in). They are similar to Trochalus fuscorufus. They are yellow and shiny. The head is finely punctate, with yellow antennae.
