= Trochalus fuscoaeneus =

Scientific classification
- Kingdom: Animalia
- Phylum: Arthropoda
- Clade: Pancrustacea
- Class: Insecta
- Order: Coleoptera
- Suborder: Polyphaga
- Infraorder: Scarabaeiformia
- Family: Scarabaeidae
- Genus: Trochalus
- Species: T. fuscoaeneus

Binomial name
- Trochalus fuscoaeneus Moser, 1916

Species of beetle

Trochalus fuscoaeneus is a species of beetle of the family Scarabaeidae. It is found in the Democratic Republic of the Congo.

== Description ==
Adults reach a length of about 8 mm. They are shiny, reddish-brown with a metallic sheen. The head is moderately densely punctate and the antennae are reddish-brown. The pronotum is quite densely punctate, with weakly setate lateral margins and with some setae laterally on the anterior margin. The elytra have rows of punctures, with the spaces between them moderately densely punctured.
