= Trochalus kapirianus =

Scientific classification
- Kingdom: Animalia
- Phylum: Arthropoda
- Clade: Pancrustacea
- Class: Insecta
- Order: Coleoptera
- Suborder: Polyphaga
- Infraorder: Scarabaeiformia
- Family: Scarabaeidae
- Genus: Trochalus
- Species: T. kapirianus

Binomial name
- Trochalus kapirianus Moser, 1916

Species of beetle

Trochalus kapirianus is a species of beetle of the family Scarabaeidae. It is found in the Democratic Republic of the Congo.

== Description ==
Adults reach a length of about 9.5 mm. They are dark reddish-brown, dull on top, with a slight silky sheen. The head, the anterior part of the pronotum and the underside are shiny. The head is moderately densely covered with rather large punctures. The antennae are yellowish-brown. The pronotum is quite densely punctured with bristle-bearing lateral margins. The elytra have rows of punctures, with the intervals flat and moderately densely covered with punctures, some of which with fine setae.
