= Trochalus nitens =

Scientific classification
- Kingdom: Animalia
- Phylum: Arthropoda
- Clade: Pancrustacea
- Class: Insecta
- Order: Coleoptera
- Suborder: Polyphaga
- Infraorder: Scarabaeiformia
- Family: Scarabaeidae
- Genus: Trochalus
- Species: T. nitens

Binomial name
- Trochalus nitens Frey, 1968

Species of beetle

Trochalus nitens is a species of beetle of the family Scarabaeidae. It is found in the Republic of the Congo.

== Description ==
Adults reach a length of about 5–6 mm. The upper and lower surfaces are blackish-brown and shiny, while the antennae and legs are brown. The upper surface of the clypeus and frons are densely and coarsely punctate and the pronotum is rather densely and coarsely punctate. The elytra have very fine, barely visible striae of punctures.
