= Trochalus parvus =

Scientific classification
- Kingdom: Animalia
- Phylum: Arthropoda
- Clade: Pancrustacea
- Class: Insecta
- Order: Coleoptera
- Suborder: Polyphaga
- Infraorder: Scarabaeiformia
- Family: Scarabaeidae
- Genus: Trochalus
- Species: T. parvus

Binomial name
- Trochalus parvus Moser, 1917

Species of beetle

Trochalus parvus is a species of beetle of the family Scarabaeidae. It is found in Ivory Coast.

== Description ==
Adults reach a length of about 5 mm. They are red and dull, while the middle of the thorax and the legs are shiny. The head is quite densely punctate and the antennae are reddish-yellow. The pronotum is densely and finely punctate, the anterior margin and the lateral margins with some setae. The elytra are quite densely covered with minutely bristle-bearing punctures. They show no rows of punctures but fine longitudinal grooves.
