= Trochalus tridentatus =

Scientific classification
- Kingdom: Animalia
- Phylum: Arthropoda
- Clade: Pancrustacea
- Class: Insecta
- Order: Coleoptera
- Suborder: Polyphaga
- Infraorder: Scarabaeiformia
- Family: Scarabaeidae
- Genus: Trochalus
- Species: T. tridentatus

Binomial name
- Trochalus tridentatus Moser, 1924

Species of beetle

Trochalus tridentatus is a species of beetle of the family Scarabaeidae. It is found in Zimbabwe.

== Description ==
Adults reach a length of about 9 mm (0.35 in). They are similar to Trochalus kristenseni. They are brown and shiny. The head is densely punctate, with yellow antennae.
