= Trochalus lucidulus =

Scientific classification
- Kingdom: Animalia
- Phylum: Arthropoda
- Class: Insecta
- Order: Coleoptera
- Suborder: Polyphaga
- Infraorder: Scarabaeiformia
- Family: Scarabaeidae
- Genus: Trochalus
- Species: T. lucidulus

Binomial name
- Trochalus lucidulus Burmeister, 1855

Synonyms
- Trochalus chloris Fåhraeus, 1857

Species of beetle

Trochalus lucidulus is a species of beetle of the family Scarabaeidae. It is found in South Africa (KwaZulu-Natal).

== Description ==
Adults reach a length of about 5.5 mm. They have greenish-bronze, shiny, ovate body. The antennae are flavous.
