= Trochalus placens =

Scientific classification
- Kingdom: Animalia
- Phylum: Arthropoda
- Class: Insecta
- Order: Coleoptera
- Suborder: Polyphaga
- Infraorder: Scarabaeiformia
- Family: Scarabaeidae
- Genus: Trochalus
- Species: T. placens

Binomial name
- Trochalus placens Péringuey, 1904

Species of beetle

Trochalus placens is a species of beetle of the family Scarabaeidae. It is found in South Africa.

== Description ==
Adults reach a length of about 7 mm. They have a reddish-brown, ampliato-ovate, convex and very shiny body. The antennae are rufescent.
