= Trochalus gebieni =

Scientific classification
- Kingdom: Animalia
- Phylum: Arthropoda
- Clade: Pancrustacea
- Class: Insecta
- Order: Coleoptera
- Suborder: Polyphaga
- Infraorder: Scarabaeiformia
- Family: Scarabaeidae
- Genus: Trochalus
- Species: T. gebieni

Binomial name
- Trochalus gebieni Moser, 1917

Species of beetle

Trochalus gebieni is a species of beetle of the family Scarabaeidae. It is found in Tanzania.

== Description ==
Adults reach a length of about 8.5–9 mm. They are black and dull. The head, pronotum (except for the basal part) and underside are shiny and the legs are brown. The head is sparsely punctate and the antennae are yellow. The pronotum is densely and finely punctate and the elytra have regular rows of punctures, the interstices densely covered with punctures.
