= Trochalus mashunus =

Scientific classification
- Kingdom: Animalia
- Phylum: Arthropoda
- Class: Insecta
- Order: Coleoptera
- Suborder: Polyphaga
- Infraorder: Scarabaeiformia
- Family: Scarabaeidae
- Genus: Trochalus
- Species: T. mashunus

Binomial name
- Trochalus mashunus Péringuey, 1904

Species of beetle

Trochalus mashunus is a species of beetle of the family Scarabaeidae. It is found in Zimbabwe.

== Description ==
Adults reach a length of about 9–10 mm. They are reddish-brown or chestnut-brown and moderately shiny, as well as more or less strongly iridescent. The antennae are flavescent. The body is massive and not spherical.
