= Trochalus globulus =

Scientific classification
- Kingdom: Animalia
- Phylum: Arthropoda
- Clade: Pancrustacea
- Class: Insecta
- Order: Coleoptera
- Suborder: Polyphaga
- Infraorder: Scarabaeiformia
- Family: Scarabaeidae
- Genus: Trochalus
- Species: T. globulus

Binomial name
- Trochalus globulus Moser, 1918

Species of beetle

Trochalus globulus is a species of beetle of the family Scarabaeidae. It is found in Nigeria.

== Description ==
Adults reach a length of about 9 mm. They are black above and blackish-brown below, with the base of the pronotum and the elytra dull. The head is rather densely punctate and the antennae are yellowish-brown. The pronotum is rather densely punctate and the elytra have rows of punctures.
