= Trochalus zuluensis =

Scientific classification
- Kingdom: Animalia
- Phylum: Arthropoda
- Clade: Pancrustacea
- Class: Insecta
- Order: Coleoptera
- Suborder: Polyphaga
- Infraorder: Scarabaeiformia
- Family: Scarabaeidae
- Genus: Trochalus
- Species: T. zuluensis

Binomial name
- Trochalus zuluensis Frey, 1968

Species of beetle

Trochalus zuluensis is a species of beetle of the family Scarabaeidae. It is found in South Africa (KwaZulu-Natal).

== Description ==
Adults reach a length of about 7 mm. The upper and lower surfaces are dark reddish-brown, shiny, smooth. They have a rather ovate, short, rather highly convex body. The pronotum and the head are rather densely punctate, as are the elytra, these without distinct rows of punctures.
