= Trochalus ingratus =

Scientific classification
- Kingdom: Animalia
- Phylum: Arthropoda
- Clade: Pancrustacea
- Class: Insecta
- Order: Coleoptera
- Suborder: Polyphaga
- Infraorder: Scarabaeiformia
- Family: Scarabaeidae
- Genus: Trochalus
- Species: T. ingratus

Binomial name
- Trochalus ingratus Frey, 1975

Species of beetle

Trochalus ingratus is a species of beetle of the family Scarabaeidae. It is found in Ghana.

== Description ==
Adults reach a length of about 6.5 mm. The upper surface is blackish-brown, dull and tomentose. The underside is shiny and brown, as are the legs. Despite the tomentose, the pronotum is still visibly very densely and finely punctate. The elytra are finely striated, but only the inner striae are visiblem while the outer striae and any possible punctation are hidden by the tomentum. The antennae are brown.
