= Trochalus fulvicornis =

Scientific classification
- Kingdom: Animalia
- Phylum: Arthropoda
- Clade: Pancrustacea
- Class: Insecta
- Order: Coleoptera
- Suborder: Polyphaga
- Infraorder: Scarabaeiformia
- Family: Scarabaeidae
- Genus: Trochalus
- Species: T. fulvicornis

Binomial name
- Trochalus fulvicornis Moser, 1926

Species of beetle

Trochalus fulvicornis is a species of beetle of the family Scarabaeidae. It is found in the Democratic Republic of the Congo.

== Description ==
Adults reach a length of about 6 mm. They are black above and blackish-brown below, with tawny antennae. The head is moderately densely punctate. The pronotum is densely but subtly punctate and the elytra are indistinctly seriate-punctate.
