= Trochalus aerugineus =

Scientific classification
- Kingdom: Animalia
- Phylum: Arthropoda
- Class: Insecta
- Order: Coleoptera
- Suborder: Polyphaga
- Infraorder: Scarabaeiformia
- Family: Scarabaeidae
- Genus: Trochalus
- Species: T. aerugineus

Binomial name
- Trochalus aerugineus Burmeister, 1855

Species of beetle

Trochalus aerugineus is a species of beetle of the family Scarabaeidae. It is found in South Africa (Western Cape, Eastern Cape, KwaZulu-Natal, Mpumalanga, Limpopo).

== Description ==
Adults reach a length of about 6–8 mm. They have a completely ferruginous-red or dark bronze, ovate and very convex, elongate-ovate or elongate body, with the head green and the elytra reddish, or completely bronze-green, shining and not iridescent. The antennae are flavous.
