= Trochalus vagus =

Scientific classification
- Kingdom: Animalia
- Phylum: Arthropoda
- Class: Insecta
- Order: Coleoptera
- Suborder: Polyphaga
- Infraorder: Scarabaeiformia
- Family: Scarabaeidae
- Genus: Trochalus
- Species: T. vagus

Binomial name
- Trochalus vagus Péringuey, 1904

Species of beetle

Trochalus vagus is a species of beetle of the family Scarabaeidae. It is found in the Democratic Republic of the Congo and Zimbabwe.

== Description ==
Adults reach a length of about 7–8 mm. They are reddish, metallic, shining, or clothed with a sub-opaque moderately iridescent indumentum. The antennae are flavous.
