= Trochalus zuluanus =

Scientific classification
- Kingdom: Animalia
- Phylum: Arthropoda
- Clade: Pancrustacea
- Class: Insecta
- Order: Coleoptera
- Suborder: Polyphaga
- Infraorder: Scarabaeiformia
- Family: Scarabaeidae
- Genus: Trochalus
- Species: T. zuluanus

Binomial name
- Trochalus zuluanus Moser, 1921

Species of beetle

Trochalus zuluanus is a species of beetle of the family Scarabaeidae. It is found in South Africa (KwaZulu-Natal).

== Description ==
Adults reach a length of about 7 mm. They are reddish-ferrugineous and shiny. The frons is quite densely punctate and the antennae are reddish-yellow. The pronotum and scutellum are densely punctate and the elytra seriate punctate, with the interstices flat and fairly densely punctate.
