= Trochalus sericeus =

Scientific classification
- Kingdom: Animalia
- Phylum: Arthropoda
- Clade: Pancrustacea
- Class: Insecta
- Order: Coleoptera
- Suborder: Polyphaga
- Infraorder: Scarabaeiformia
- Family: Scarabaeidae
- Genus: Trochalus
- Species: T. sericeus

Binomial name
- Trochalus sericeus Frey, 1970

Species of beetle

Trochalus sericeus is a species of beetle of the family Scarabaeidae. It is found in Ivory Coast.

== Description ==
Adults reach a length of about 8 mm. The upper and lower surfaces are brown. The underside is shiny, while the upper surface is semi-dull, with the head and the rest of the pronotum shiny. The dull areas on the upper surface are slightly iridescent and weakly tomentose. The upper surface is densely and moderately finely punctate and the elytra are densely punctate with clearly visible fine striae.
