= Trochalus quadrifoliatus =

Scientific classification
- Kingdom: Animalia
- Phylum: Arthropoda
- Clade: Pancrustacea
- Class: Insecta
- Order: Coleoptera
- Suborder: Polyphaga
- Infraorder: Scarabaeiformia
- Family: Scarabaeidae
- Genus: Trochalus
- Species: T. quadrifoliatus

Binomial name
- Trochalus quadrifoliatus Moser, 1921

Species of beetle

Trochalus quadrifoliatus is a species of beetle of the family Scarabaeidae. It is found in Tanzania.

== Description ==
Adults reach a length of about 7 mm. They are reddish-brown and shiny. The head is moderately densely punctate and the antennae are red. The pronotum is densely but finely punctate and the elytra are seriate-punctate, with the interstices fairly densely covered with punctures.
