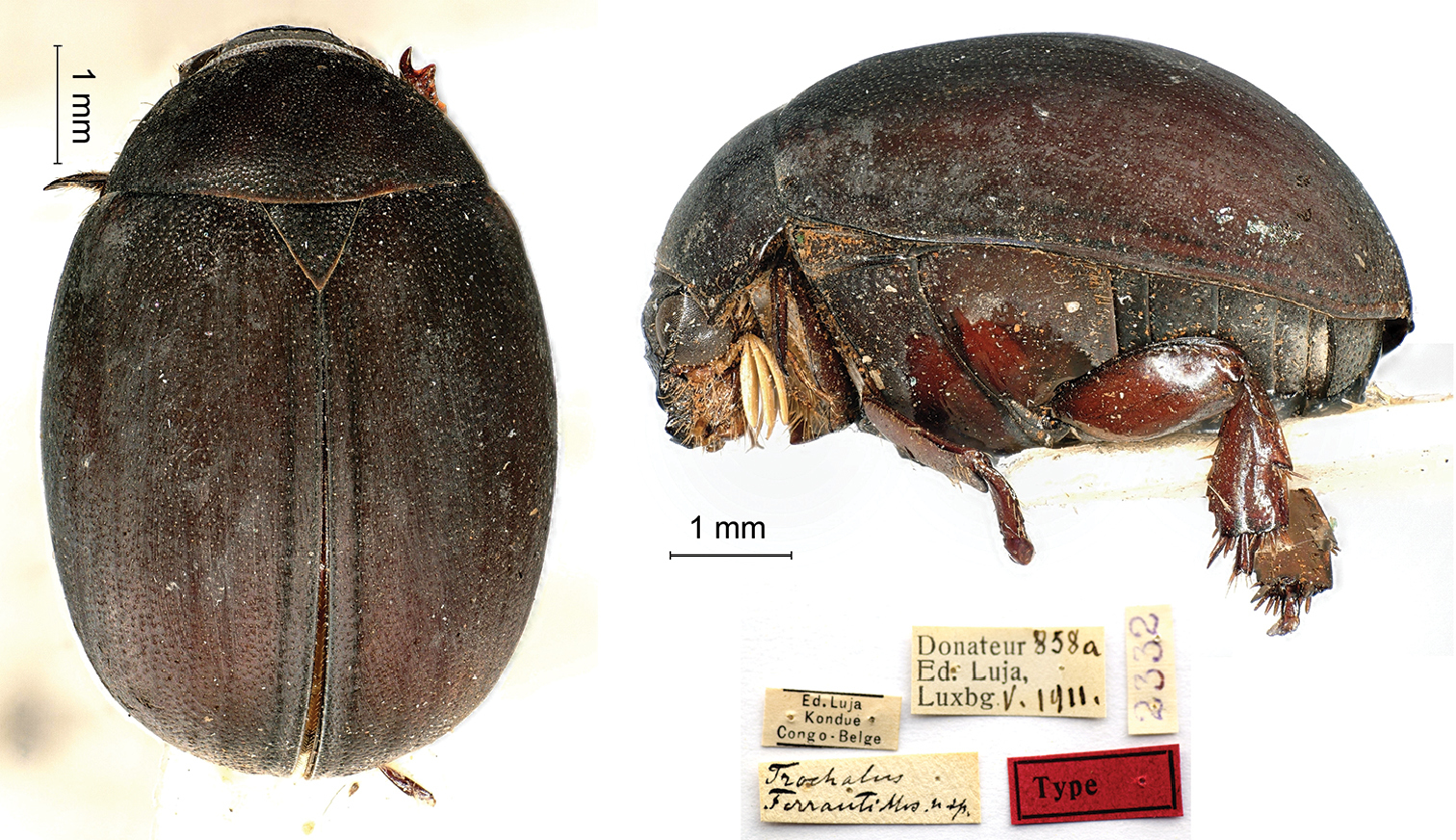

Scientific classification
- Kingdom: Animalia
- Phylum: Arthropoda
- Clade: Pancrustacea
- Class: Insecta
- Order: Coleoptera
- Suborder: Polyphaga
- Infraorder: Scarabaeiformia
- Family: Scarabaeidae
- Genus: Trochalus
- Species: T. ferranti

Binomial name
- Trochalus ferranti Moser, 1917

= Trochalus ferranti =

Species of beetle

Trochalus ferranti is a species of beetle of the family Scarabaeidae. It is found in the Democratic Republic of the Congo.

== Description ==
Adults reach a length of about 6 mm. The head is strongly punctate, with the posterior part of the frons dull. There are several setae next to the eyes. The antennae are yellowish-brown. The pronotum is densely and finely punctate, the anterior margin is setate and there are also some setae anteriorly next to the lateral margins. The rows of punctures on the elytra are hardly visible and the interstices are shallow and fairly densely punctured.
