= Trochalus rosettae =

Scientific classification
- Kingdom: Animalia
- Phylum: Arthropoda
- Clade: Pancrustacea
- Class: Insecta
- Order: Coleoptera
- Suborder: Polyphaga
- Infraorder: Scarabaeiformia
- Family: Scarabaeidae
- Genus: Trochalus
- Species: T. rosettae

Binomial name
- Trochalus rosettae Frey, 1976

Species of beetle

Trochalus rosettae is a species of beetle of the family Scarabaeidae. It is found in Cameroon.

== Description ==
Adults reach a length of about 8-8.5 mm. The upper surface is blackish-brown to dark reddish-brown, dull and tomentose. The frons is glossy and the pygidium is dull. The pronotum has a few scattered hairs on the anterior margin and the ventral segments have very scattered setae. The lateral margins of the elytra are finely, loosely, and pale-ciliate, but the rest is glabrous. The antennae are brown, with a yellow club.
