= Trochalus silfverbergi =

Scientific classification
- Kingdom: Animalia
- Phylum: Arthropoda
- Clade: Pancrustacea
- Class: Insecta
- Order: Coleoptera
- Suborder: Polyphaga
- Infraorder: Scarabaeiformia
- Family: Scarabaeidae
- Genus: Trochalus
- Species: T. silfverbergi

Binomial name
- Trochalus silfverbergi Frey, 1970

Species of beetle

Trochalus silfverbergi is a species of beetle of the family Scarabaeidae. It is found in Sudan.

== Description ==
Adults reach a length of about 6-6.5 mm. The upper and lower surfaces are dark reddish-brown, the antennae yellow, the clypeus and frons glossy, and the remaining upper surface and pygidium dull and faintly tomentose. The lateral margin of the pronotum and lateral margin of the elytra are faintly fringed with pale cilia, but otherwise glabrous.
