= Trochalus macrophthalmus =

Scientific classification
- Kingdom: Animalia
- Phylum: Arthropoda
- Clade: Pancrustacea
- Class: Insecta
- Order: Coleoptera
- Suborder: Polyphaga
- Infraorder: Scarabaeiformia
- Family: Scarabaeidae
- Genus: Trochalus
- Species: T. macrophthalmus

Binomial name
- Trochalus macrophthalmus Frey, 1963

Synonyms
- Trochalus macrophtalmus

Species of beetle

Trochalus macrophthalmus is a species of beetle of the family Scarabaeidae. It is found in Tanzania.

== Description ==
Adults reach a length of about 7.5 mm. They are light red, with the margin of the pronotum and clypeus suture slightly darker. The elytra are rather dull, but the rest of the upper and lower surfaces is glossy. The upper surface of the clypeus is moderately densely and rather finely punctate, while the frons is somewhat more finely punctate and the pronotum and elytra are shallowly punctate. The latter is also finely striate.
