= Trochalus rubricatus =

Scientific classification
- Kingdom: Animalia
- Phylum: Arthropoda
- Class: Insecta
- Order: Coleoptera
- Suborder: Polyphaga
- Infraorder: Scarabaeiformia
- Family: Scarabaeidae
- Genus: Trochalus
- Species: T. rubricatus

Binomial name
- Trochalus rubricatus Boheman, 1860

Species of beetle

Trochalus rubricatus is a species of beetle of the family Scarabaeidae. It is found in Botswana and South Africa (KwaZulu-Natal).

== Description ==
Adults reach a length of about 7.5–8.5 mm. They have a reddish, opaque, faintly metallic body, which is more sericeous on the upper part than iridescent. The antennae are flavescent, with the club very long in males.
