= Trochalus bohemani =

Scientific classification
- Kingdom: Animalia
- Phylum: Arthropoda
- Class: Insecta
- Order: Coleoptera
- Suborder: Polyphaga
- Infraorder: Scarabaeiformia
- Family: Scarabaeidae
- Genus: Trochalus
- Species: T. bohemani

Binomial name
- Trochalus bohemani Gerstaecker, 1867

Synonyms
- Trochalus picipes Fåhraeus, 1857 (preocc.)

Species of beetle

Trochalus bohemani is a species of beetle of the family Scarabaeidae. It is found in South Africa (Limpopo, Gauteng, Mpumalanga).

== Description ==
Adults reach a length of about 7–8 mm. They have a dark bronze (sometimes turning chestnut-red), strongly iridescent, ampliato-ovate body. The legs are reddish and the antennae are flavescent.
