= Trochalus doblerae =

Scientific classification
- Kingdom: Animalia
- Phylum: Arthropoda
- Clade: Pancrustacea
- Class: Insecta
- Order: Coleoptera
- Suborder: Polyphaga
- Infraorder: Scarabaeiformia
- Family: Scarabaeidae
- Genus: Trochalus
- Species: T. doblerae

Binomial name
- Trochalus doblerae Frey, 1975

Species of beetle

Trochalus doblerae is a species of beetle of the family Scarabaeidae. It is found in South Africa (North West).

== Description ==
Adults reach a length of about 7 mm. The upper surface is semi-dull and blackish-brown, while the head and anterior and lateral part of the pronotum are shiny. The antennae are brown. The head and the shiny part of the pronotum are densely and moderately punctate and the scutellum and elytra are finely, shallowly, and sparsely punctate with tiny setae in the punctures.
