= Trochalus urunguensis =

Scientific classification
- Kingdom: Animalia
- Phylum: Arthropoda
- Clade: Pancrustacea
- Class: Insecta
- Order: Coleoptera
- Suborder: Polyphaga
- Infraorder: Scarabaeiformia
- Family: Scarabaeidae
- Genus: Trochalus
- Species: T. urunguensis

Binomial name
- Trochalus urunguensis Moser, 1924

Species of beetle

Trochalus urunguensis is a species of beetle of the family Scarabaeidae. It is found in eastern Africa and Tanzania.

== Description ==
Adults reach a length of about 7.5 mm. They are ferruginous and shiny. The head is quite densely punctate and the antennae are rust-coloured.
