= Trochalus jokoensis =

Scientific classification
- Kingdom: Animalia
- Phylum: Arthropoda
- Clade: Pancrustacea
- Class: Insecta
- Order: Coleoptera
- Suborder: Polyphaga
- Infraorder: Scarabaeiformia
- Family: Scarabaeidae
- Genus: Trochalus
- Species: T. jokoensis

Binomial name
- Trochalus jokoensis Moser, 1917

Species of beetle

Trochalus jokoensis is a species of beetle of the family Scarabaeidae. It is found in Cameroon.

== Description ==
Adults reach a length of about 7 mm. They are blackish-brown and shiny. The forehead is fairly densely punctate and the antennae are yellow. The pronotum is densely punctate and the anterior margin is laterally fringed with setae, and some setae are also present beside the lateral margins. The elytra have rows of punctures, with the intervals densely covered with fine punctures.
