= Trochalus piger =

Scientific classification
- Kingdom: Animalia
- Phylum: Arthropoda
- Clade: Pancrustacea
- Class: Insecta
- Order: Coleoptera
- Suborder: Polyphaga
- Infraorder: Scarabaeiformia
- Family: Scarabaeidae
- Genus: Trochalus
- Species: T. piger

Binomial name
- Trochalus piger Frey, 1970

Species of beetle

Trochalus piger is a species of beetle of the family Scarabaeidae. It is found in Ivory Coast.

== Description ==
Adults reach a length of about 5 mm. The upper and lower surfaces are dark brown (but the antennae are yellow) and glabrous. The clypeus and frons are shiny, but the rest of the upper surface is dull and tomentose. The underside is shiny. The elytra are densely and finely punctate without any discernible striations.
