= Trochalus excellens =

Scientific classification
- Kingdom: Animalia
- Phylum: Arthropoda
- Clade: Pancrustacea
- Class: Insecta
- Order: Coleoptera
- Suborder: Polyphaga
- Infraorder: Scarabaeiformia
- Family: Scarabaeidae
- Genus: Trochalus
- Species: T. excellens

Binomial name
- Trochalus excellens Moser, 1916

Species of beetle

Trochalus excellens is a species of beetle of the family Scarabaeidae. It is found in the Democratic Republic of the Congo.

== Description ==
Adults reach a length of about 10–11 mm. They are dark brown, silky and iridescent. The frons is quite extensively covered with coarse punctures and there are setae next to the eyes. The pronotum is quite densely covered with fine punctures and the lateral margins and anterior margin have setae. The elytra have punctures, with the intervals moderately densely punctured.
