= Trochalus fraterculus =

Scientific classification
- Kingdom: Animalia
- Phylum: Arthropoda
- Clade: Pancrustacea
- Class: Insecta
- Order: Coleoptera
- Suborder: Polyphaga
- Infraorder: Scarabaeiformia
- Family: Scarabaeidae
- Genus: Trochalus
- Species: T. fraterculus

Binomial name
- Trochalus fraterculus Kolbe, 1913

Synonyms
- Trochalus fraterculus integer Kolbe, 1913

Species of beetle

Trochalus fraterculus is a species of beetle of the family Scarabaeidae. It is found in Kenya, Mozambique and Tanzania.

== Description ==
Adults reach a length of about 7–8 mm (0.28–0.31 in). They are dull brown to dark brown, with the antennae rust-coloured and the flabellum yellow. The pronotum is laterally slightly rounded behind the middle, densely sparsely punctate on the back, with a longitudinal impression along the middle. The elytra are simply striate, with the striae not impressed, and the spaces in between punctate.
