= Trochalus opaculus =

Scientific classification
- Kingdom: Animalia
- Phylum: Arthropoda
- Clade: Pancrustacea
- Class: Insecta
- Order: Coleoptera
- Suborder: Polyphaga
- Infraorder: Scarabaeiformia
- Family: Scarabaeidae
- Genus: Trochalus
- Species: T. opaculus

Binomial name
- Trochalus opaculus Moser, 1916

Species of beetle

Trochalus opaculus is a species of beetle of the family Scarabaeidae. It is found in the Democratic Republic of the Congo.

== Description ==
Adults reach a length of about 7 mm. They are blackish-brown and dull, but the head is shiny and strongly punctate. The frons has a few setae next to the eyes. The antennae are yellowish-brown. The pronotum is densely covered with fine punctures and the anterior margin and the lateral margins are setate. The elytra have rows of punctures and the flat intervals are moderately densely punctate.
