= Trochalus =

Scientific classification
- Kingdom: Animalia
- Phylum: Arthropoda
- Clade: Pancrustacea
- Class: Insecta
- Order: Coleoptera
- Suborder: Polyphaga
- Infraorder: Scarabaeiformia
- Family: Scarabaeidae
- Subfamily: Sericinae
- Tribe: Sericini
- Genus: Trochalus; Laporte, 1832

Genus of leaf beetles

Trochalus is a genus of beetles belonging to the family Scarabaeidae.

== Species ==
- Epitrochalus Frey, 1960
  - Trochalus alternans (Frey, 1960)
  - Trochalus badius Boheman, 1860
  - Trochalus bailundensis Moser, 1920
  - Trochalus damarus Péringuey, 1904
  - Trochalus insignis Moser, 1918
  - Trochalus major (Frey, 1960)
  - Trochalus modestus Péringuey, 1892
  - Trochalus placens Péringuey, 1904
  - Trochalus tetraphyllus (Frey, 1966)
  - Trochalus zambesianus Moser, 1924
  - Trochalus zuluensis Frey, 1968
- Trochalus
  - Trochalus aeneopiceus Fairmaire, 1882
  - Trochalus aenescens Moser, 1916
  - Trochalus aereus Frey, 1970
  - Trochalus aerugineus Burmeister, 1855
  - Trochalus aethiopicus Moser, 1916
  - Trochalus angolanus Moser, 1916
  - Trochalus ardoini Frey, 1968
  - Trochalus aruensis Burgeon, 1944
  - Trochalus atratus Burmeister, 1855
  - Trochalus beiranus Frey, 1964
  - Trochalus bicarinatus Moser, 1919
  - Trochalus bituberculatus Moser, 1916
  - Trochalus bohemani Gerstaecker, 1867
  - Trochalus bonsae Frey, 1970
  - Trochalus bredoi Burgeon, 1944
  - Trochalus brevipes Moser, 1917
  - Trochalus byrrhinus Fåhraeus, 1857
  - Trochalus camaruensis Quedenfeldt, 1888
  - Trochalus camerunensis Brenske, 1903
  - Trochalus carinatus (Gyllenhal, 1817)
  - Trochalus cariniceps Kolbe, 1914
  - Trochalus cariniger Kolbe, 1914
  - Trochalus carinulatus Moser, 1916
  - Trochalus collarti Burgeon, 1944
  - Trochalus conspicuus Moser, 1919
  - Trochalus corinthia Gerstaecker, 1867
  - Trochalus corpulentus Quedenfeldt, 1888
  - Trochalus crampelanus Moser, 1917
  - Trochalus denticeps Moser, 1916
  - Trochalus discoideus (Fabricius, 1801)
  - Trochalus distinctus Moser, 1918
  - Trochalus diversirostris Frey, 1963
  - Trochalus doblerae Frey, 1975
  - Trochalus ealanus Moser, 1924
  - Trochalus elisabethae Burgeon, 1944
  - Trochalus elisabethanus Burgeon, 1944
  - Trochalus endroedii Frey, 1974
  - Trochalus exasperans Péringuey, 1904
  - Trochalus excellens Moser, 1916
  - Trochalus ferranti Moser, 1917
  - Trochalus flavicornis Moser, 1924
  - Trochalus francevillensis Moser, 1916
  - Trochalus fraterculus Kolbe, 1913
  - Trochalus freynei Burgeon, 1944
  - Trochalus fulgidus Fåhraeus, 1857
  - Trochalus fulvescens Quedenfeldt, 1884
  - Trochalus fulvicolor Moser, 1924
  - Trochalus fulvicornis Moser, 1926
  - Trochalus fulvus Moser, 1916
  - Trochalus fuscipes Moser, 1917
  - Trochalus fuscoaeneus Moser, 1916
  - Trochalus fuscorufus Moser, 1916
  - Trochalus gebieni Moser, 1917
  - Trochalus gibbus (Fabricius, 1781)
  - Trochalus globulus Moser, 1918
  - Trochalus guineensis Frey, 1973
  - Trochalus henrardi Burgeon, 1944
  - Trochalus heterosternus Moser, 1917
  - Trochalus hulstaerti Burgeon, 1944
  - Trochalus imitans Frey, 1962
  - Trochalus imputatus (Gyllenhal, 1817)
  - Trochalus infranitens Fairmaire, 1887
  - Trochalus ingratus Frey, 1975
  - Trochalus inops Péringuey, 1904
  - Trochalus integriceps Moser, 1917
  - Trochalus iridescens Frey, 1968
  - Trochalus iridicolor Kolbe, 1914
  - Trochalus iringicus Moser, 1916
  - Trochalus jokoensis Moser, 1917
  - Trochalus kabindanus Moser, 1916
  - Trochalus kapirianus Moser, 1916
  - Trochalus kasenyensis Burgeon, 1944
  - Trochalus kigonseranus Moser, 1919
  - Trochalus kilimanus Kolbe, 1910
  - Trochalus kindaensis Burgeon, 1944
  - Trochalus kisantuensis (Burgeon, 1943)
  - Trochalus kochi Frey, 1968
  - Trochalus kristenseni Moser, 1916
  - Trochalus kwiluensis Moser, 1924
  - Trochalus lamtoensis Frey, 1970
  - Trochalus lepidus Péringuey, 1904
  - Trochalus lindianus Moser, 1916
  - Trochalus longicornis Moser, 1924
  - Trochalus lucens Frey, 1970
  - Trochalus lucidulus Burmeister, 1855
  - Trochalus lukuledianus Moser, 1920
  - Trochalus macrocerus Moser, 1916
  - Trochalus macrophthalmus Frey, 1963
  - Trochalus maculifrons Fairmaire, 1886
  - Trochalus madjuensis Burgeon, 1944
  - Trochalus malelanus Moser, 1916
  - Trochalus margaritaceus Lansberge, 1882
  - Trochalus mashunus Péringuey, 1904
  - Trochalus massarti Burgeon, 1944
  - Trochalus maynei Moser, 1924
  - Trochalus micans Frey, 1974
  - Trochalus miniaticollis Moser, 1916
  - Trochalus monticola Frey, 1974
  - Trochalus motoensis (Burgeon, 1943)
  - Trochalus mwikanus Moser, 1924
  - Trochalus nigerianus Frey, 1960
  - Trochalus nigrescens Moser, 1919
  - Trochalus nigropiceus Moser, 1917
  - Trochalus niloticus Blanchard, 1850
  - Trochalus nitens Frey, 1968
  - Trochalus obtusidens Quedenfeldt, 1884
  - Trochalus opacipennis Moser, 1916
  - Trochalus opaculus Moser, 1916
  - Trochalus opimus Kolbe, 1914
  - Trochalus orbiculatus Péringuey, 1904
  - Trochalus overlaeti Burgeon, 1944
  - Trochalus parvus Moser, 1917
  - Trochalus pectoralis Brenske, 1899
  - Trochalus peramihoanus Moser, 1916
  - Trochalus piceolus Moser, 1917
  - Trochalus piceus (Fabricius, 1781)
  - Trochalus picipes Klug, 1855
  - Trochalus piger Frey, 1970
  - Trochalus pilula (Klug, 1835)
  - Trochalus politus Moser, 1919
  - Trochalus pondoensis Frey, 1968
  - Trochalus pruinosus Kolbe, 1914
  - Trochalus puncticeps (Burgeon, 1943)
  - Trochalus quadrifoliatus Moser, 1921
  - Trochalus quinquedentatus Burgeon, 1944
  - Trochalus roseoviridis Burgeon, 1944
  - Trochalus rosettae Frey, 1976
  - Trochalus rotundatus Laporte, 1832
  - Trochalus rubricatus Boheman, 1860
  - Trochalus ruficolor Moser, 1916
  - Trochalus rufoflavus Moser, 1916
  - Trochalus rufofulvus Moser, 1916
  - Trochalus rufulus Thomson, 1858
  - Trochalus rugifrons Thomson, 1858
  - Trochalus saginatus Kolbe, 1914
  - Trochalus salaamus Moser, 1924
  - Trochalus schoutedeni Moser, 1924
  - Trochalus schwetzi Burgeon, 1944
  - Trochalus scutellaris Moser, 1916
  - Trochalus sebakuanus Péringuey, 1904
  - Trochalus semiaeneus Kolbe, 1883
  - Trochalus seminitens Fairmaire, 1884
  - Trochalus sericeus Frey, 1970
  - Trochalus sibutanus Moser, 1916
  - Trochalus silfverbergi Frey, 1970
  - Trochalus similis Frey, 1968
  - Trochalus simplex Frey, 1973
  - Trochalus soyerae Burgeon, 1944
  - Trochalus spectabilis Quedenfeldt, 1884
  - Trochalus sphaeroides Blanchard, 1850
  - Trochalus splendidulus Fåhraeus, 1857
  - Trochalus sternalis Moser, 1916
  - Trochalus subcarinatus Burgeon, 1944
  - Trochalus subnitens Burgeon, 1944
  - Trochalus subrotundus Linell, 1896
  - Trochalus sudanensis Moser, 1916
  - Trochalus sudanicus Moser, 1919
  - Trochalus tenuivestis Moser, 1916
  - Trochalus testaceipennis Moser, 1916
  - Trochalus theryi Burgeon, 1944
  - Trochalus tomentosus Moser, 1917
  - Trochalus toraensis Burgeon, 1944
  - Trochalus tridentatus Moser, 1924
  - Trochalus tuberculatus (Gyllenhal, 1817)
  - Trochalus uelleanus Brenske, 1899
  - Trochalus ukamicus Moser, 1919
  - Trochalus ukerewius Kolbe, 1913
  - Trochalus umbugwensis Moser, 1916
  - Trochalus urbanus Péringuey, 1904
  - Trochalus urundiensis Moser, 1920
  - Trochalus urunguensis Moser, 1924
  - Trochalus usambaricus Moser, 1916
  - Trochalus uvirensis Burgeon, 1944
  - Trochalus vagus Péringuey, 1904
  - Trochalus vanderysti Burgeon, 1944
  - Trochalus villiersi Frey, 1966
  - Trochalus viridicollis Moser, 1916
  - Trochalus wauanus Moser, 1919
  - Trochalus yeboensis Burgeon, 1944
  - Trochalus zuluanus Moser, 1921
