= Trochalus exasperans =

Scientific classification
- Kingdom: Animalia
- Phylum: Arthropoda
- Class: Insecta
- Order: Coleoptera
- Suborder: Polyphaga
- Infraorder: Scarabaeiformia
- Family: Scarabaeidae
- Genus: Trochalus
- Species: T. exasperans

Binomial name
- Trochalus exasperans Péringuey, 1904

Species of beetle

Trochalus exasperans is a species of beetle of the family Scarabaeidae. It is found in Zimbabwe.

== Description ==
Adults reach a length of about 7–9.5 mm. They are bronze, with an iridescent sheen turning to reddish-bronze. The antennae are flavescent.
