= Trochalus saginatus =

Scientific classification
- Kingdom: Animalia
- Phylum: Arthropoda
- Clade: Pancrustacea
- Class: Insecta
- Order: Coleoptera
- Suborder: Polyphaga
- Infraorder: Scarabaeiformia
- Family: Scarabaeidae
- Genus: Trochalus
- Species: T. saginatus

Binomial name
- Trochalus saginatus Kolbe, 1914

Species of beetle

Trochalus saginatus is a species of beetle of the family Scarabaeidae. It is found in Tanzania.

== Description ==
Adults reach a length of about 9 mm (0.35 in). They are similar to Trochalus corinthia. They have an egg-shaped, entirely velvety black body, with a brownish-black hue. They are mainly dull above, although the head is glossy. The underside is dull brown, but the legs are smooth, glossy dark brown. The pygidium is red.
