= Trochalus kabindanus =

Scientific classification
- Kingdom: Animalia
- Phylum: Arthropoda
- Clade: Pancrustacea
- Class: Insecta
- Order: Coleoptera
- Suborder: Polyphaga
- Infraorder: Scarabaeiformia
- Family: Scarabaeidae
- Genus: Trochalus
- Species: T. kabindanus

Binomial name
- Trochalus kabindanus Moser, 1916

Species of beetle

Trochalus kabindanus is a species of beetle of the family Scarabaeidae. It is found in the Democratic Republic of the Congo.

== Description ==
Adults reach a length of about 7 mm. They are brown or blackish-brown and dull, although the middle of the thorax and the legs are shiny. The head is rather sparsely punctate and shiny. The pronotum is rather densely and finely punctate and the anterior margin and the lateral margins are finely bristled. The elytra rows of punctures, with the spaces between them flat and covered with tiny, bristle-like punctures.
