= Trochalus wauanus =

Scientific classification
- Kingdom: Animalia
- Phylum: Arthropoda
- Clade: Pancrustacea
- Class: Insecta
- Order: Coleoptera
- Suborder: Polyphaga
- Infraorder: Scarabaeiformia
- Family: Scarabaeidae
- Genus: Trochalus
- Species: T. wauanus

Binomial name
- Trochalus wauanus Moser, 1919

Species of beetle

Trochalus wauanus is a species of beetle of the family Scarabaeidae. It is found in Sudan.

== Description ==
Adults reach a length of about 8.5–9 mm. They are similar to Trochalus peramihoanus. They are dull, bronze-black above and glossy, blackish-brown below. The legs are brown. The head is more densely punctate than in peramihoanus and the pronotum is somewhat longer and the posterior angles are less rounded.
