= Trochalus damarus =

Scientific classification
- Kingdom: Animalia
- Phylum: Arthropoda
- Class: Insecta
- Order: Coleoptera
- Suborder: Polyphaga
- Infraorder: Scarabaeiformia
- Family: Scarabaeidae
- Genus: Trochalus
- Species: T. damarus

Binomial name
- Trochalus damarus Péringuey, 1904

Synonyms
- Epitrochalus zumpti Frey, 1960

Species of beetle

Trochalus damarus is a species of beetle of the family Scarabaeidae. It is found in Namibia.

== Description ==
Adults reach a length of about 7-7.5 mm. They have a chestnut-brown, elongate-ovate, convex, shiny, faintly iridescent body. The antennae are flavous.
