= Trochalus urbanus =

Scientific classification
- Kingdom: Animalia
- Phylum: Arthropoda
- Class: Insecta
- Order: Coleoptera
- Suborder: Polyphaga
- Infraorder: Scarabaeiformia
- Family: Scarabaeidae
- Genus: Trochalus
- Species: T. urbanus

Binomial name
- Trochalus urbanus Péringuey, 1904

Species of beetle

Trochalus urbanus is a species of beetle of the family Scarabaeidae. It is found in Zimbabwe.

== Description ==
Adults reach a length of about 6.5 mm. They have a testaceous-red, shining, elongate-ovate body. The antennae have the pedicel testaceous and the club flavous.
