= Trochalus sudanicus =

Scientific classification
- Kingdom: Animalia
- Phylum: Arthropoda
- Clade: Pancrustacea
- Class: Insecta
- Order: Coleoptera
- Suborder: Polyphaga
- Infraorder: Scarabaeiformia
- Family: Scarabaeidae
- Genus: Trochalus
- Species: T. sudanicus

Binomial name
- Trochalus sudanicus Moser, 1919

Species of beetle

Trochalus sudanicus is a species of beetle of the family Scarabaeidae. It is found in Sudan.

== Description ==
Adults reach a length of about 9 mm. They are similar to Trochalus ukerewius, but the upper surface is less strongly glossy and somewhat iridescent. The frons is broad and fine, and the clypeus is more strongly and more closely punctured. On the elytra, the intervals are more distinctly wrinkled and the punctures are a little closer together.
