= Trochalus byrrhinus =

Scientific classification
- Kingdom: Animalia
- Phylum: Arthropoda
- Class: Insecta
- Order: Coleoptera
- Suborder: Polyphaga
- Infraorder: Scarabaeiformia
- Family: Scarabaeidae
- Genus: Trochalus
- Species: T. byrrhinus

Binomial name
- Trochalus byrrhinus Fåhraeus, 1857

Species of beetle

Trochalus byrrhinus is a species of beetle of the family Scarabaeidae. It is found in the Democratic Republic of the Congo and South Africa (Mpumalanga, Limpopo).

== Description ==
Adults reach a length of about 7-7.5 mm. They are sub-spherical, short, and plainly convex in the anterior part of the elytra. They are dark bronze and opaque. The antennae are flavescent.
