= Amitābha =

Celestial Buddha of Buddhism

- The Great Buddha of Kamakura in the Kōtoku-in temple
- Sanskrit: अमिताभः; IAST: Amitābhaḥ; अमितायुः; IAST: Amitāyuḥ
- Burmese: အမိတာဘ
- Chinese: 阿弥陀佛, 阿彌陀佛; Pinyin: Āmítuó Fó
- Japanese: 阿弥陀仏(あみだぶつ), 阿弥陀如来(あみだにょらい) (romaji: Amida Butsu, Amida Nyorai)
- Korean: 아미타불; RR: Amitabul
- Mongolian: ᠠᠪᠢᠳᠠ᠂ ᠠᠶᠣᠰᠢ; Авид, Аюуш; SASM/GNC: Abida, Ayusi
- Tibetan: འོད་དཔག་མེད; Wylie: od dpag med
- Vietnamese: A Di Đà Phật

Information
- Venerated by: Mahāyāna, Vajrayāna

Amitābha (Sanskrit pronunciation: [ɐmɪˈtaːbʱɐ], "Measureless" or "Limitless" Light), also known as Amituofo in Chinese, Amida Butsu in Japanese, Amita-bul in Korean, Avid in Mongolian, A Di Đà Phật in Vietnamese, and Öpakmé in Tibetan, is one of the main Buddhas of Mahayana Buddhism and the most widely venerated Buddhist figure in East Asian Buddhism. Amitābha is also known by the name Amitāyus ("Measureless Life").

Amitābha is the main figure in two influential Indian Buddhist Mahayana Scriptures: the Sutra of Measureless Life and the Amitābha Sūtra. According to the Sutra of Measureless Life, Amitābha established a pure land of perfect peace and happiness, called Sukhāvatī ("Blissful"), where beings who mindfully remember him with faith may be reborn and then quickly attain enlightenment. The pure land is the result of a set of vows Amitābha made long ago. As his name means Limitless Light, Amitābha's light is said to radiate throughout the cosmos and shine on all beings. Because of this, Amitābha is often depicted radiating light, a symbol for his wisdom. As per the name Amitāyus, this Buddha is also associated with infinite life, since his lifespan is said to be immeasurable. Amitābha's measureless life is seen as being related to his infinite compassion.

Amitābha devotion is particularly prominent in East Asian Buddhism, where the practice of mindfulness of Amitābha Buddha (known as nianfo in Chinese, nembutsu in Japanese) is seen as a path to liberation open to everyone. Amitābha is also the principal Buddha in Pure Land Buddhism, which is a tradition focused on attaining birth in the pure land by relying on the power of Amitābha (also known as "Other Power") and faithfully reciting Amitabha's name. Amitābha is also a major Buddha in Tibetan Buddhism, where he is associated with pure land practices, as well as phowa (the transference of consciousness at the time of death).

The names Amitāyus and Amitābha (in various Chinese transliterations and translations) are used interchangeably in East Asian Buddhism. In Tibetan Buddhism however, Amitāyus is distinguished from Amitābha, and they are depicted differently in Himalayan art. Amitāyus is also known as a Buddha of long life in Tibetan Buddhism. In East Asian Buddhism, Amitābha is most often depicted as part of a triad with the two bodhisattvas Avalokiteśvara and Mahāsthāmaprāpta. In Tibetan Buddhism, the triad includes Avalokiteśvara and Vajrapani (or Padmasambhava) instead.

== Indian Mahayana sources ==
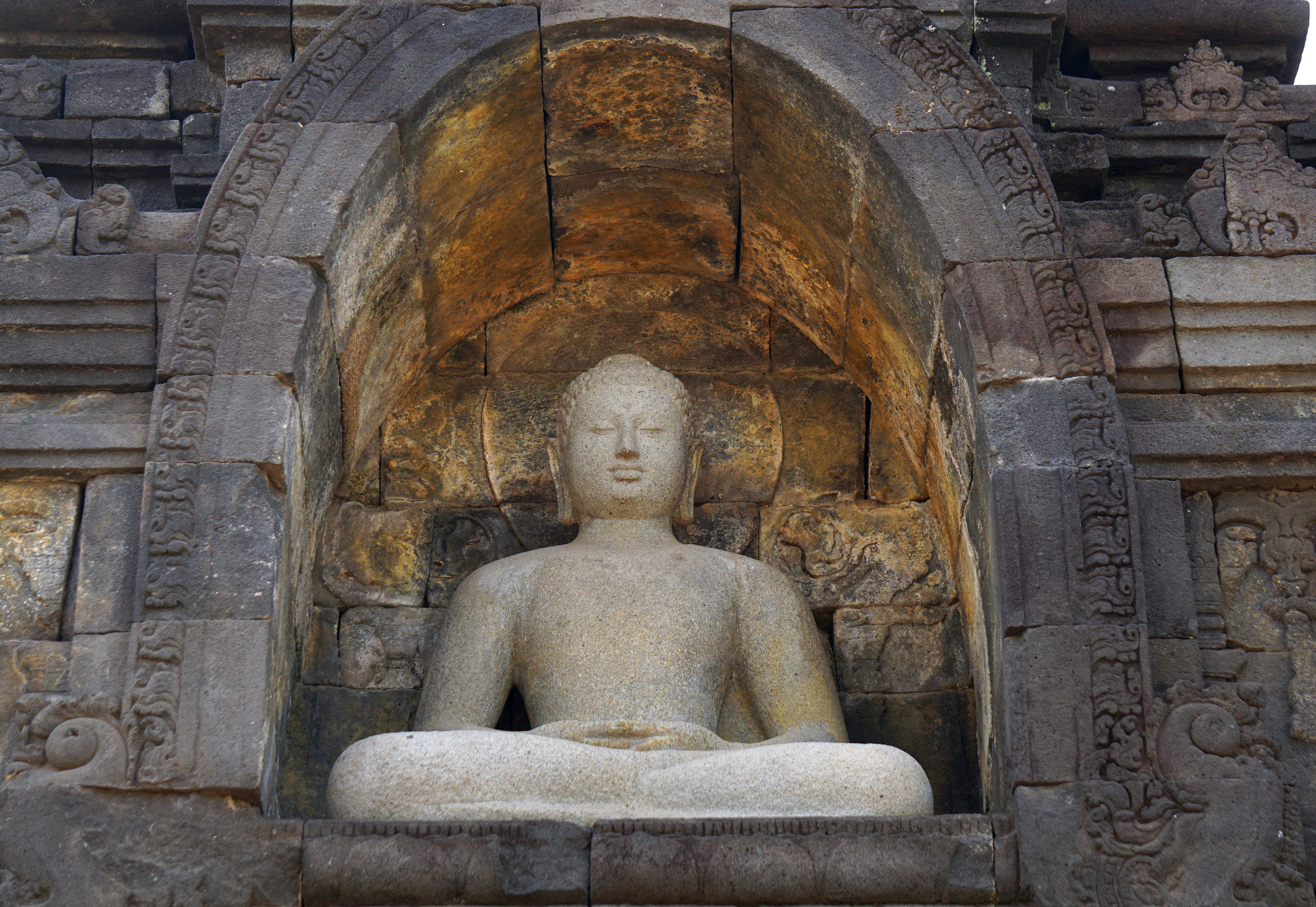
Amitabha statue in Borobudur, Indonesia

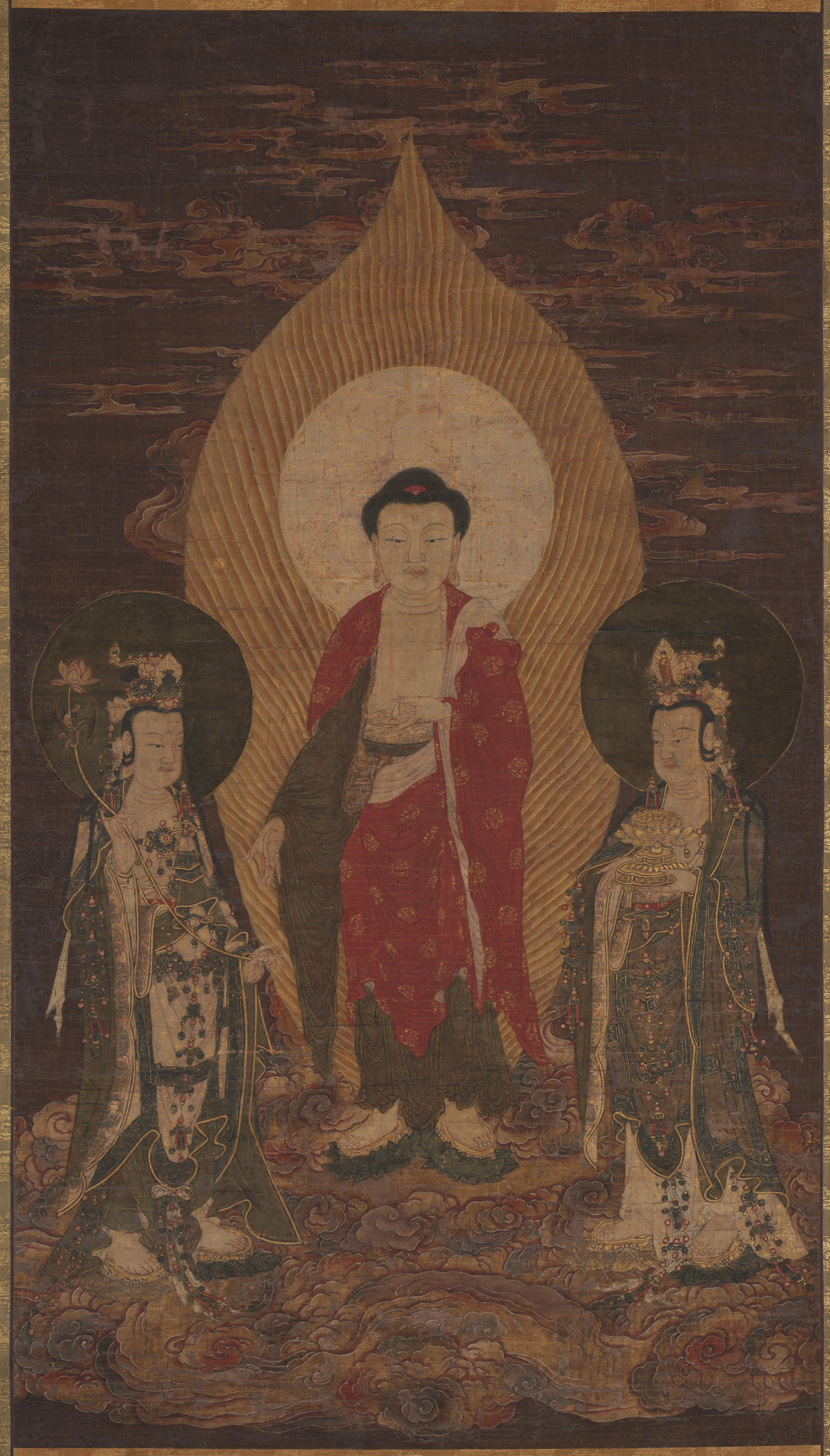
Korean Amitabha triad with Avalokiteśvara and Mahāsthāmaprāpta, the standard Amitabha triad according to the Larger Sukhāvatīvyūha

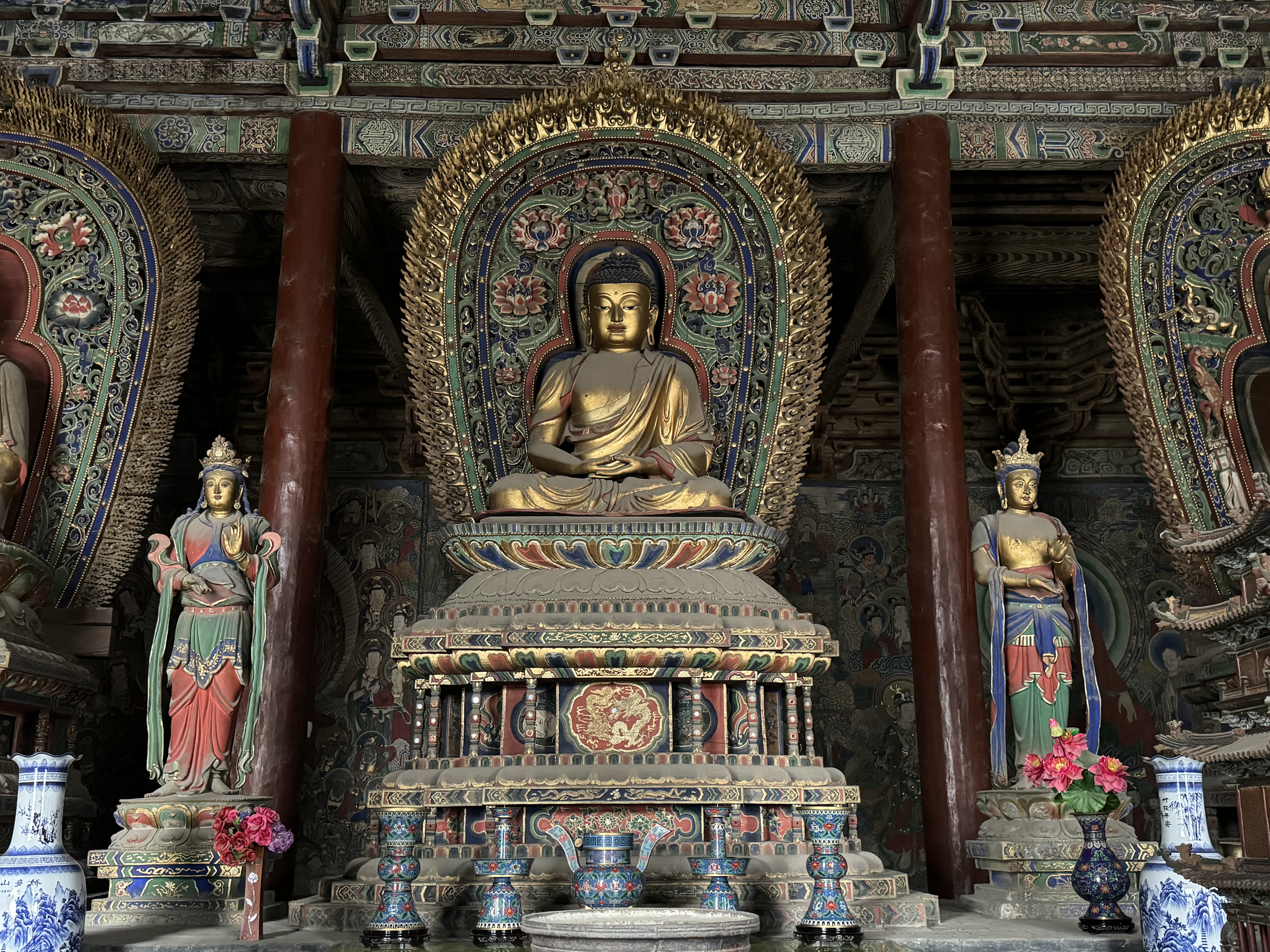
Ming dynasty (1368–1644) statue of Amituo as one of the Five Tathagathas at Huayan Temple in Datong, Shanxi, China

=== In the Sukhāvatīvyūha Sūtras ===
The most influential Amitābha focused Mahayana sutras are two sutras known by the Sanskrit title Sukhāvatī-vyūha (Blissful Array, or the Array of Sukhāvatī). These two are the Short Sukhāvatīvyūha Sūtra (also known as the Amitābha Sutra) and the Larger Sukhāvatīvyūha Sūtra (also known as the Sutra of Infinite Life). These sutras are the main Indian Mahayana sources for the teachings on Amitābha and his pure land. In these sutras, Amitābha is a transcendent and immortal Buddha who resides in a pure buddhafield that he created. This pure land is located billions of worlds away in the western direction and all beings can attain rebirth there, where they can swiftly become Buddhas themselves.

According to the Sūtra of Limitless Life, eons ago, Amitābha was a bodhisattva monk named Dharmākara. In some versions of the sūtra, Dharmākara is described as a former king who, having come into contact with Buddhist teachings through the buddha Lokeśvararāja, renounced his throne and became a monk. For five eons (kalpas), Dharmākara contemplated all the qualities of all the pure buddhafields (realms created by a Buddha existing outside of ordinary reality) throughout the cosmos. He then resolved to become a Buddha and to create the best of all pure buddha-fields possessed of many supreme qualities.

The sutra then recounts how Dharmākara made a series of bodhisattva vows (praṇidhāna), pledging that unless these vows were fulfilled, he would not attain Buddhahood. Different versions of the text list varying numbers of these vows (the most common sutra contains forty eight vows), which serves as the foundation for Pure Land doctrine. These solemn resolutions set out the type of pure land Dharmākara aspired to create, the conditions under which beings might be born into that world, and what kind of beings they would be. After many eons of bodhisattva practice, Dharmākara became Amitābha Buddha (his enlightenment having occurred ten kalpas ago). Since he now presides over the Pure Land of Sukhāvatī ("Utmost Bliss") in the western direction, it is understood that his vows were indeed fulfilled.

Among these "past vows", Dharmākara promised that all beings born in his land would never fall into lower realms, and would possess golden divine bodies with many superpowers. He also vowed that they would be firmly established on the path to Buddhahood and could enjoy profound peace, happiness and an unlimited lifespan there.

The central aspect of these vows is the ones which discuss how to attain birth in the pure land. In Pure Land Buddhism, one of the most influential passages has been the eighteenth vow, which states:

If, when I attain Buddhahood, sentient beings in the lands of the ten directions who sincerely and joyfully entrust themselves to me, desire to be born in my land, and think of me even ten times should not be born there, may I not attain perfect enlightenment. Excluded however, are those who commit the five grave offenses and abuse the Right Dharma.

This vow is also called the "original" or "fundamental" vow in East Asian Pure Land Buddhism, indicating its special status in this tradition. This vow, along with some other passages, made it possible to argue that all kinds of people would attain birth in the pure land, even very wicked, deluded and defiled persons. Barring that one did not commit the five grave acts (patricide, matricide, the murder of an arhat, harming a Buddha, causing schism in the sangha), this scripture seems to open up the possibility of birth in the pure land to everyone who faithfully thinks of the Amitābha even just ten times. A modified version of this universalist teaching (which even removes the exclusion of beings who commit the five grave acts) would become a central doctrine of Pure Land Buddhism and remains part of its lasting appeal. The sutra also explains how, at the moment of death, Amitābha will appear to those who have aspired to be born in Sukhāvatī. Bodhisattvas who arrive in Sukhāvatī enter the state of non-retrogression (from which there is no falling back into lower states of rebirth), and the state of "one more birth", meaning they require only one additional lifetime before attaining Buddhahood. Once in Sukhāvatī, all beings can also easily visit other pure lands to make offerings to innumerable Buddhas. In Sukhāvatī, beings are born asexually, appearing fully formed upon lotus flowers in Amitābha's presence. Some lotuses remain closed, signifying individuals who still harbor doubts about Amitābha. Such beings remain enclosed for 500 years, experiencing their lotus as a palace, yet deprived of the Buddha's presence. Eventually, as they dispel their doubts, they emerge from this period of purification and witness the splendor of Amitābha.

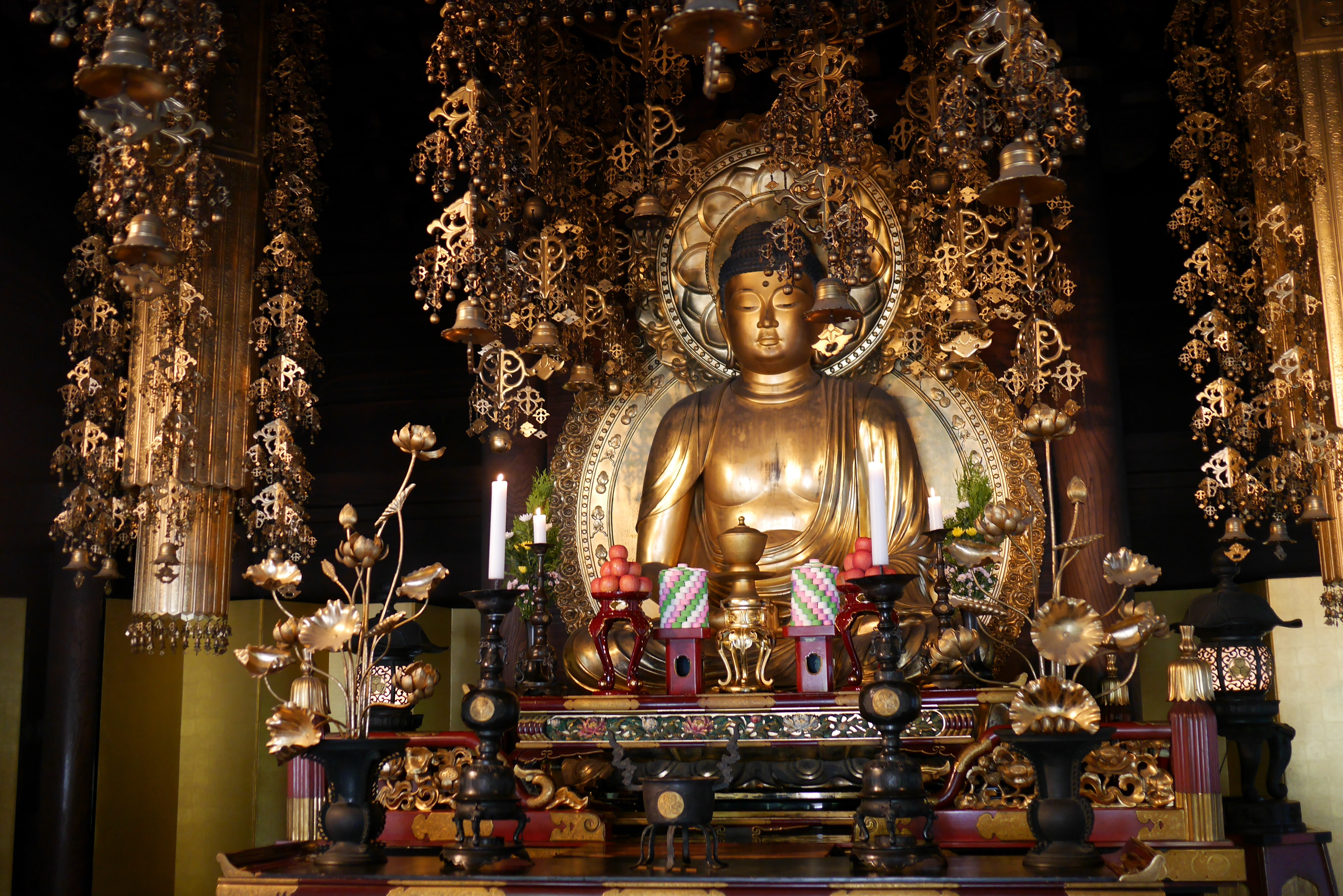
The main Amitabha image at Chion-in temple, Kyoto, Japan

Both versions of the Sukhāvatīvyūha Sūtra provide various descriptions which may have served as a guide for meditating on Amitābha within his Pure Land. According to the sutras, those aspiring to be reborn there should cultivate bodhicitta, listen to Amitābha's name, contemplate him, pray for rebirth in his land, and accumulate merit as a basis for their future birth. Given these conditions, rebirth in Sukhāvatī and eventual enlightenment are significantly more accessible than striving for Buddhahood under the harsh conditions of this world, which is Amitābha Buddha's ultimate intent for creating the pure land. This teaching about an easily accessible afterlife made Amitābha a popular Buddha in Gandhara, from where it spread to Central Asia and East Asia.

Regarding the Smaller Sukhāvatīvyūha Sūtra, this text primarily describes the various features of Sukhāvatī and further clarifies the methods of attaining rebirth there. It describes, for example, how the birds and trees of Sukhāvatī, themselves manifestations of Amitābha, continuously sing songs of the Dharma. According to this sūtra, rebirth in Sukhāvatī is achieved by sincerely holding Amitābha's name in mind with undistracted focus for one to seven days—an application of the ancient meditation known as buddhānusmṛti (recollection of the Buddha).

==== The nature of Amitābha ====
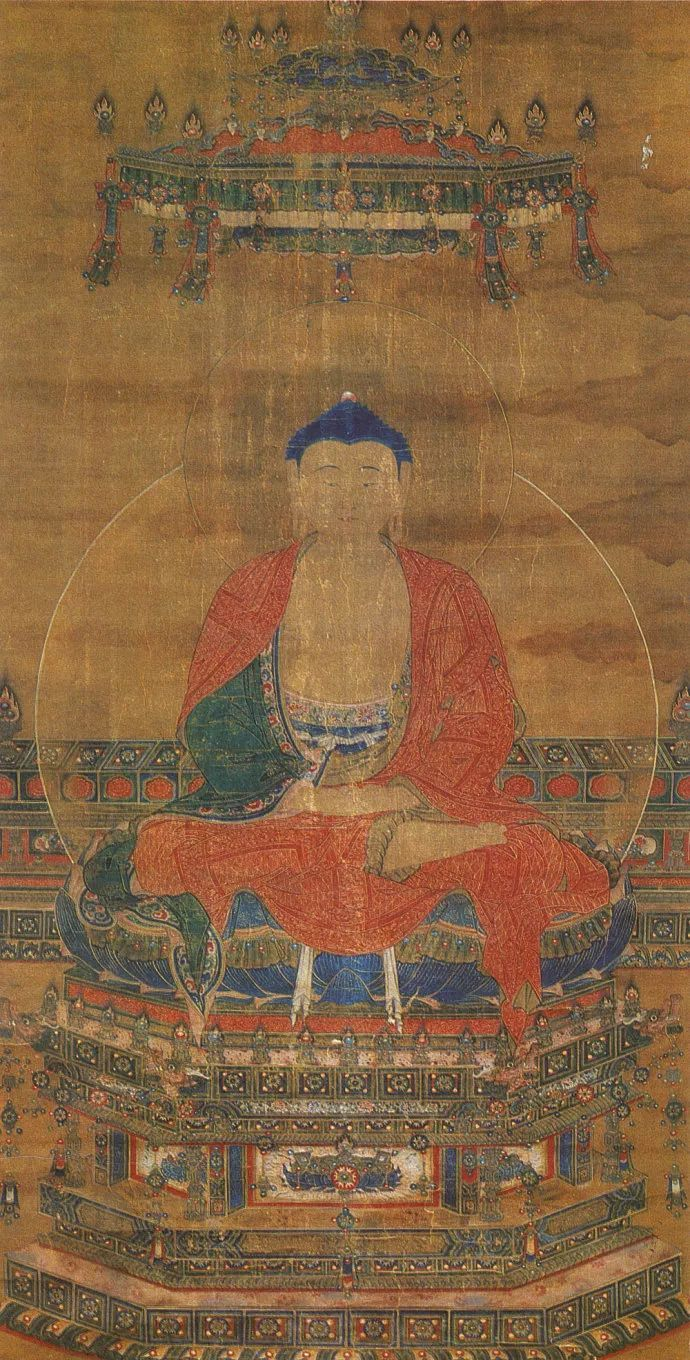
Ming dynasty (1368–1644) Shuilu ritual painting of Amituo from Baoning Temple^{[zh]}, Shanxi, China

The Larger Sukhāvatīvyūha Sūtra describes the Buddha Amitābha as having a body that radiates limitless light throughout the ten directions. The sutra states:

The majestic radiance of the Buddha of Immeasurable Life is exalted and supreme; the radiance of other Buddhas cannot compare with it. Some Buddhas' light shines upon a hundred Buddha-lands, and other Buddhas' light shines upon a thousand Buddha-lands. Briefly stated, the light of the Buddha of Immeasurable Life illuminates all the Buddha-lands.....Sentient beings who encounter this light have the three defilements swept away, and they become soft and gentle in body and mind. They leap and dance with joy, and the good mind arises in them. When those suffering pain and travail in the three evil realms see this light, they all find respite and become free of afflictions. After their lives have ended, they will all gain emancipation. The light of the Buddha of Immeasurable Life is resplendent and brilliantly illuminates the lands of the Buddhas throughout the ten quarters; there is no place where it is not heard. It is not I alone who praise this light now; all Buddhas, sravakas, pratyekabuddhas, and bodhisattvas together praise it just as I do.

In the Larger Sukhāvatīvyūha, Shakyamuni also describes the Buddha Amitābha's light as inconceivable and ultimate indescribable, saying that he "could never describe it completely", even if he spent eons trying.

Regarding the lifespan of Amitābha, the Larger Sukhāvatīvyūha Sūtra states that it is "everlasting and beyond reckoning", totally beyond any calculation or thought.

Both Sukhāvatīvyūha sūtras also proclaim Buddha Amitābha's special status, by stating that he is praised and revered by all the Buddhas of the ten quarters and that all Buddhas teach their retinues about birth in Amitābha's Pure Land.

=== References in other sutras ===
Amitābha is also mentioned in numerous other Buddhist sources. Kenneth Tanaka notes that "Thirty one Sanskrit texts and over one hundred Chinese and Tibetan translations refer to Amitābha* and/or Sukhavati.*"

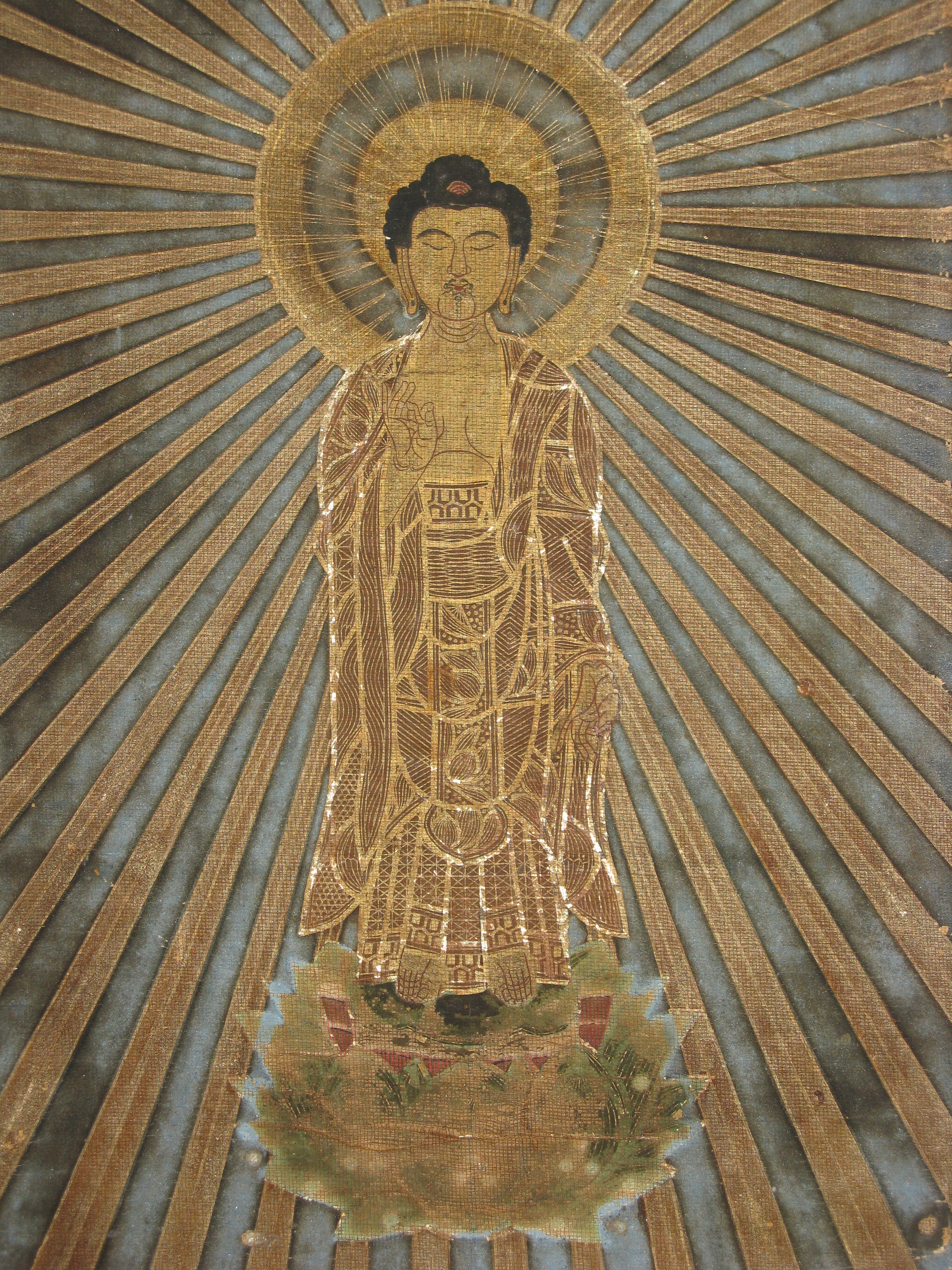
"Amida Manifesting in the Dharma-body of Expedient Means", Japanese painting, at the Met

The earliest Buddhist sutra mentioning Amitābha is the translation into Chinese of the Pratyutpanna Samādhi Sūtra (般舟三昧經; Bozhōu Sānmèi Jīng) by the Kushan monk Lokakṣema. This text has been dated to between the 1st century BCE and 2nd century CE by modern buddhologists and may have been translated from the Gandhari language (a fragment of which was discovered in 2018). Other important Mahayana texts which mention Amitabha and his pure land of Sukhavati include the Ajitasena Sutra, the Lotus Sutra, the Nirvana Sutra, the Mahāmegha Sutra, and the Samādhirāja Sūtra. Jeff Wilson writes that over a fifth of the sutras in the Taishō Tripiṭaka reference Amitābha, but three sutras in particular have become seen as canonical in East Asian Buddhism: the two Sukhāvatīvyūha Sūtras discussed above and the Amitāyus Contemplation Sūtra. The Contemplation Sūtra is believed to have been translated into Chinese by Kalayāśas in the early fifth century and belongs to a group of texts focused on the visualization of Buddhas. Unlike other Pure Land sūtras, the Contemplation Sūtra emphasizes meditative practices to have a vision of Amitābha, including thirteen stages of visualization. These include meditating on the setting sun, pure water turning into beryl, and eventually visualizing the entire Pure Land with its jeweled pavilions, lotus throne, Amitāyus (Amitābha), and his attendant Bodhisattvas, Avalokiteśvara and Mahāsthāmaprāpta.

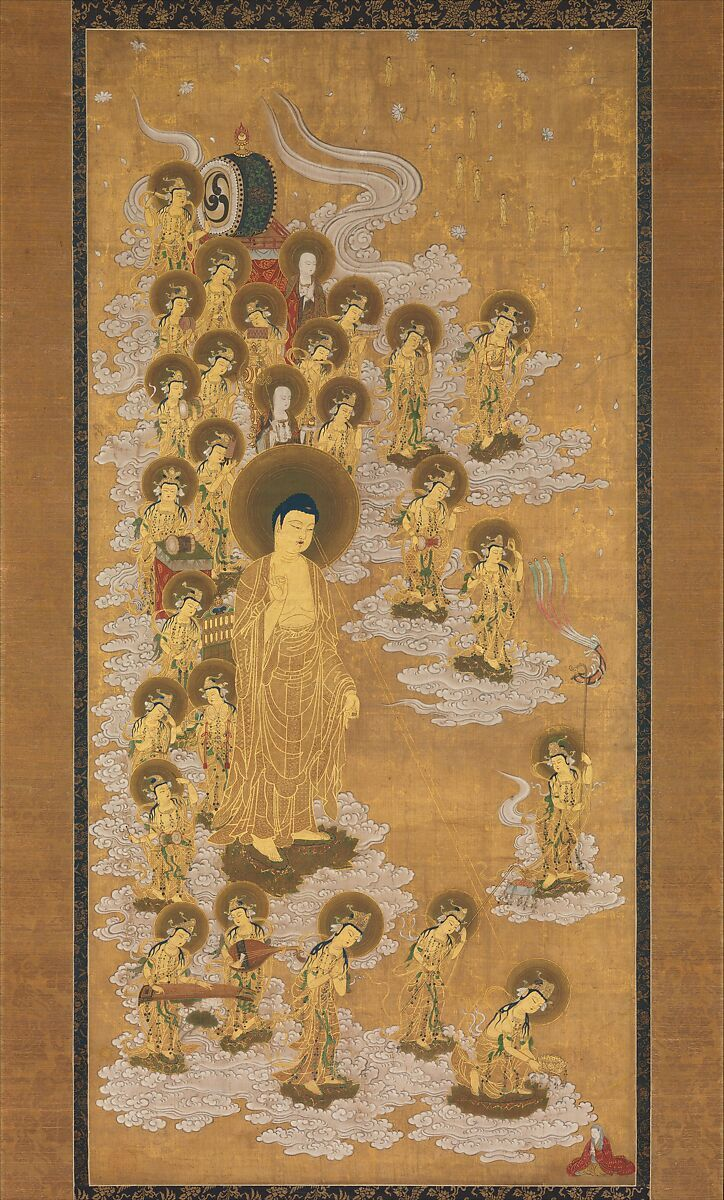
A scroll depicting the "Welcoming Descent" (Ch: laiying, Jp: raigo) of Amida Buddha and Twenty-five Bodhisattvas coming to guide a dying person to the pure land, 1668, Japan, Edo period. MET.

The sūtra also explains that even those guilty of the five gravest transgressions may, just before death, encounter a virtuous teacher who instructs them in the Buddha's Dharma. If such a person sincerely calls upon Amitāyus' name ten times, their accumulated negative karma will be purified, and they will be reborn within a lotus bud in Sukhāvatī. After twelve eons, the lotus will bloom, and the individual will behold Avalokiteśvara and Mahāsthāmaprāpta, who will preach the Dharma and inspire them to cultivate bodhicitta. This sūtra became a cornerstone of the Pure Land tradition, as it offers hope to all people. Its emphasis on salvation through Amitābha's boundless compassion extends even to the most evil individuals.

=== Dharanis ===
There are several dhāraṇī (Buddhist incantations, spells) associated with Amitabha. These are dhāraṇī were believed to have protective spiritual power when recited and were also seen as leading to birth in the Pure Land of Sukhavati. These are found in Indian Dhāraṇī sutras (sutras focused on specific magical chants) which are focused on Amitābha, including various editions of the Amitabha Pure Land Rebirth Dhāraṇī.

In East Asian Buddhism, the Amitabha Pure Land Rebirth Dhāraṇī (commonly called the Rebirth Mantra) is one of the most popular Amitabha dharanis, commonly chanted alongside the Amitabha Sutra, usually 21, 27 or 49 times per day. The standard short version of the dharani which is commonly practiced in Chinese Buddhism is:

Namo amitābhāya tathāgatāya | tadyathā | amṛtodbhave | amṛta-siddhaṃbhave | amṛta-vikrānte | amṛtavikrānta | gāmine gagana kīrtakare | svāhā ||

Chinese tradition associates the dhāraṇī with bodhisattva Nagarjuna, who is said to have received the dhāraṇī from Amitabha Buddha in a dream according to the Gunabhadra translation of this dharani. Traditionally, Nagarjuna is also believed to have attained birth in the Pure Land through this dhāraṇī. While the dhāraṇī's name indicates that it leads to rebirth in Sukhavati, reciting the dhāraṇī is also said to "pull out the fundamental cause of karmic obstacles", as well as to protect from evil spirits and forces. There is also another Amitabha dharani commonly chanted in Chinese Buddhism called the Dhāraṇī of the Radiance King of Resolute Great Wisdom and Immeasurable Life (聖無量壽決定光明王陀羅尼). Both of these dhāraṇī are part of the Ten Small Mantras which are widely chanted in Chinese Buddhist monasteries and temples. This dhāraṇī is:

namo bhagavate aparimitāyur-jñāna-suviniścita-tejorājāya | tathāgatāyārhate samyak-saṁbuddhāya | tad-yathā [oṁ puṇya mahā-puṇya | aparimita-puṇya | aparimitāyuḥ-puṇya-jñāna-saṁbhāropacite | oṁ sarva saṁskāra pariśuddha dharmate gagana samudgate | svabhāva viśuddhe mahā-naya parivāre svāhā ||

A version of this dhāraṇī is also found in the Tibetan Buddhism canon in the Aparimitāyurjñānasūtra (Toh 674).

A longer dharani of Amitabha is found in Sūtra of the Dhāraṇī of the King of the Sound of Amitābha's Drum (T370). Furthermore there is also a longer dharani in the Tibetan canon which is named the Aparimitāyurjñānahṛdayadhāraṇī.

The Viśuddhaprabhā Dhāraṇī is another related dharani which mentions Amitabha Buddha's name and is said to lead to birth in his pure land. The Anantamukhanirhāra-dhāraṇī-sūtra, also known as the Amida Dhāraṇī Sūtra, is another text that is associated with Pure Land rebirth and Amitabha. It was popular enough to have been translated into Chinese in ten different translations and to have also received an Indian commentary (by Jñanagarbha).

=== In Mahayana treatises ===
Some Mahāyāna treatises mention Amitābha. The Dasabhumikavibhāsā (十住毘婆沙論, T.1521), which is traditionally ascribed to Nāgārjuna and survives only in a Chinese translation by Kumārajīva (344-413), teaches the "easy" practice of maintaining constant mindfulness of Amitābha Buddha as a way to attain birth in the pure land. The authorship of this text has been disputed by some scholars, including Akira Hirakawa.

Vasubandhu (fl. 4th to 5th century CE) is traditionally credited with composing the Discourse on the Pure Land (T.1524), a commentary on the Shorter Sukhāvatīvyūha Sūtra, which only survives in Chinese translation by the Indian translator Bodhiruci (6th century). This work outlines a five-part practice that may have functioned as a visualization meditation. Amitābha and his pure are also briefly discussed by Vasubandhu's brother Asanga in his Mahāyānasaṃgraha.

The author of the Ratnagotravibhāga concludes the text with the following dedication to Amitāyus: "By the merit I have acquired through [writing] this [treatise], may all living beings come to perceive the Lord Amitāyus* endowed with infinite light."

=== History and archeology ===
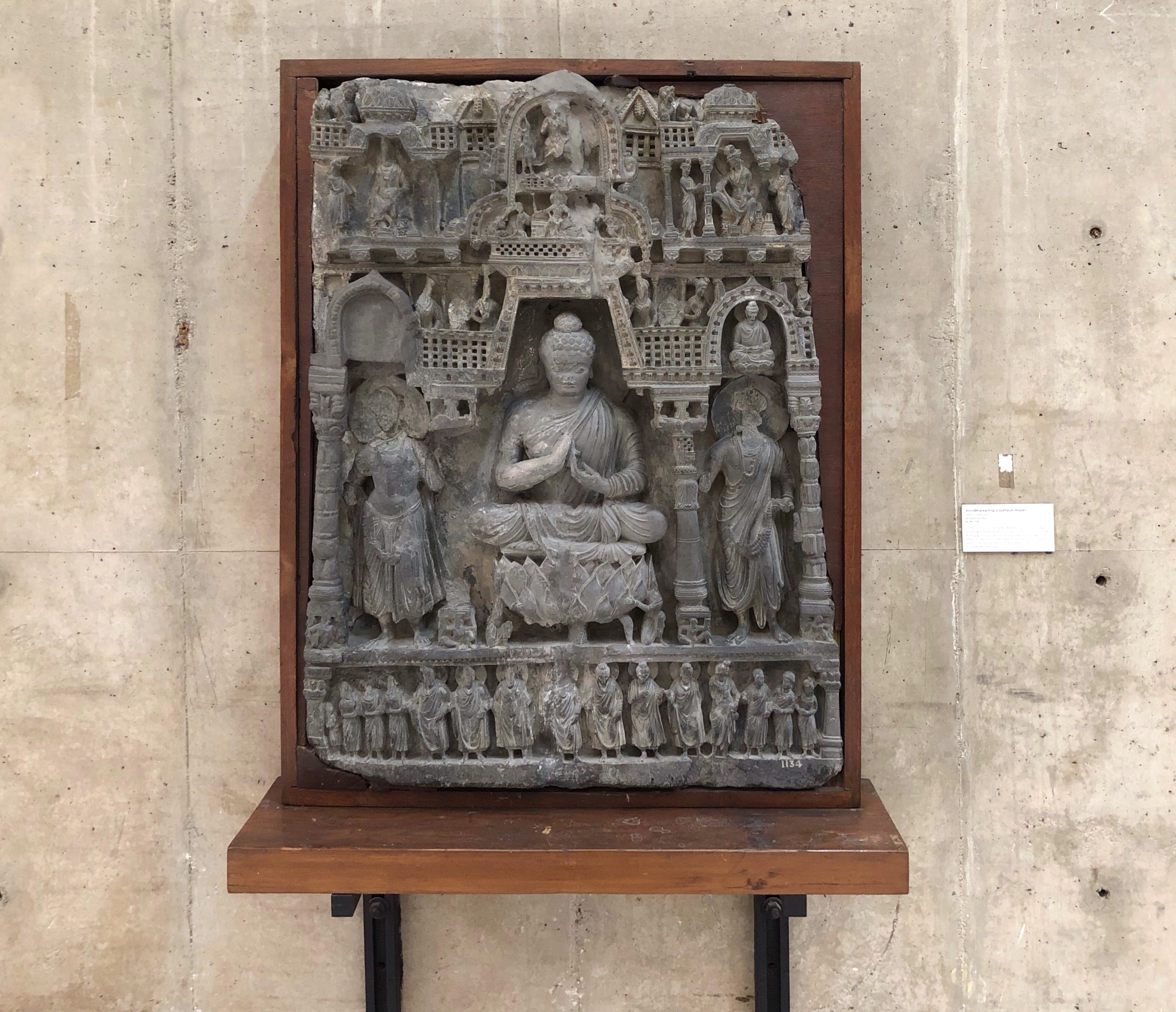
Gandharan sculpture depicting “Amitabha preaching in Sukhavati,” 2nd century CE, from the site of Muhammad Nari (present-day northwestern Pakistan). Government Museum and Art Gallery, Chandigarh.

According to Kenneth Tanaka, Amitābha Buddha emerged as a central figure in the Gandharan Buddhism of the first century CE. Numerous Amitābha Buddha images have been discovered in the Greater Gandhāra region (in modern Pakistan and Afghanistan) from about the first century CE onwards during the Kushan era (30–375 CE). This, along with evidence which suggests that the two main Pure Land sutras were written in the Gandhari language, indicates that Amitābha rose to prominence in Gandharan Buddhism (and in the greater Kushana Empire) during the first century CE.

Regarding the main historical source of the figure of Amitābha, some Western scholars have proposed possible influences on Buddhism from Zoroastrian deities (Ahura Mazda or Zurvan) or from Brahmanical deities or concepts (such as the sun god Surya or the immortality nectar Amritā). Japanese scholars like Kōtatsu Fujita meanwhile tend to place the origin of Amitābha Buddha squarely within Buddhist tradition.

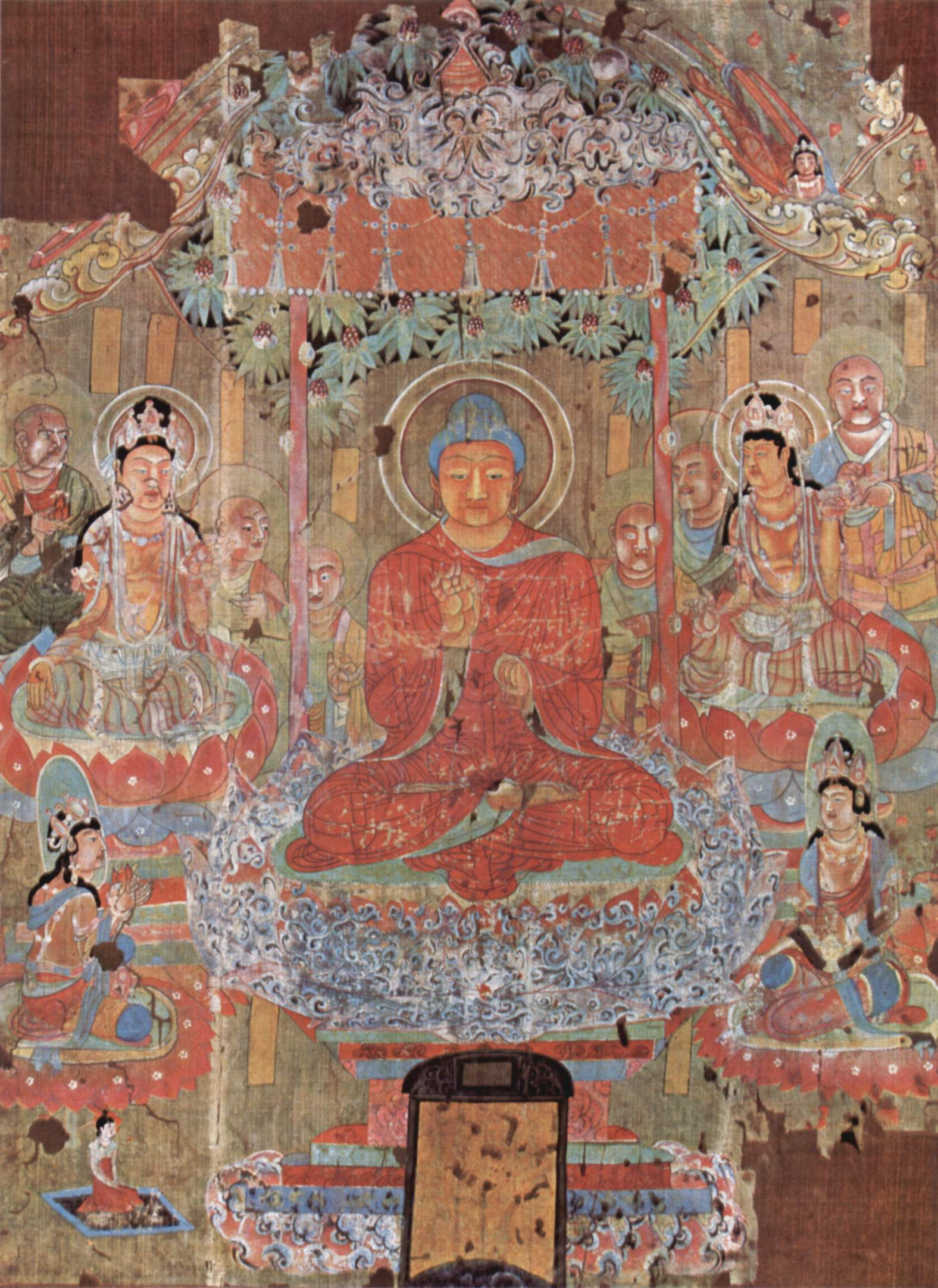
A painting of Amitabha discovered at Dunhuang

Other scholars, especially Japanese authors, cite various passages from earlier Buddhist sources which mention Shakyamuni Buddha radiating light rays and which state that his lifespan is immeasurable. Such ideas seem to have been most common in the early Buddhist Mahāsāṃghika tradition, who promoted the docetic idea that the Buddha was ultimately a transcendent (lokottara) being who nevertheless manifested a magical body on earth. One of their sutras is cited by Vasumitra (in a passage that was translated three times by different Chinese figures) as stating that "the form body (rupakaya), supernatural power (prabhāva) and lifespan (ayus) of a Buddha is unlimited (ananta)." Julian Pas also notes that, in the version translated by Kumārajīva, Vasumitra's passage speaks of the limitless light of the Buddha ("kuan-ming-wu-liang"), which could be a translation of abha amita.

Another Mahāsāṃghika (Lokottaravāda) source, the Mahāvastu, states: "the purity of the Buddha is so great that the worship of the Exalted One is sufficient for the attainment of Nirvāna" and "from the Buddha's smile, there radiate beams which illuminate all buddhafields." Pas sees the Mahāsāṃghika as promoting a kind of Buddhist bhakti (devotional) movement. These connections with early Mahāsāṃghika doctrines indicate the possibility that Amitābha may have initially signified the limitless lifespan and radiance of the Buddha, pointing to the transcendent dimensions of the historical Buddha Shakyamuni. Since the Mahāsāṃghika school was also active in the northwest of India and as far north as Bamiyan (Afghanistan), Pas argues that they are a likely source for the ideas that influenced the rise of the devotional cultus of Amitābha in northwest India, Gandhara, and Bactria.

Earliest "Amitābha" inscription
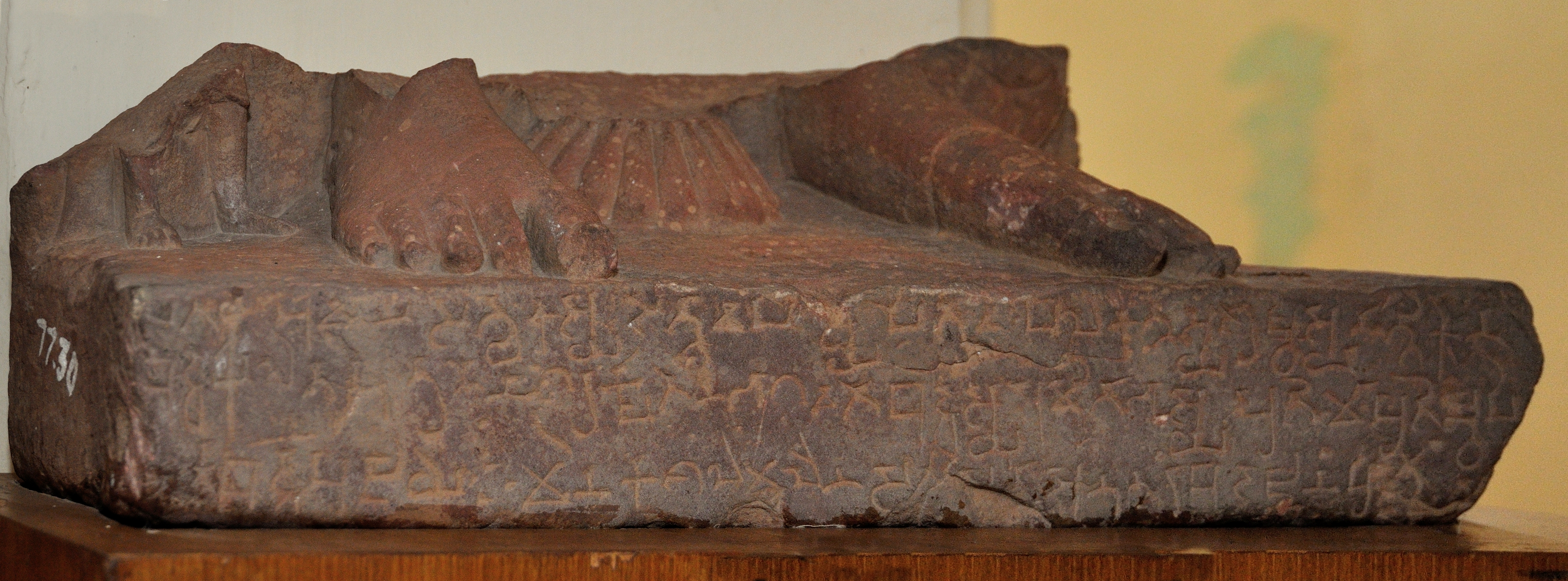
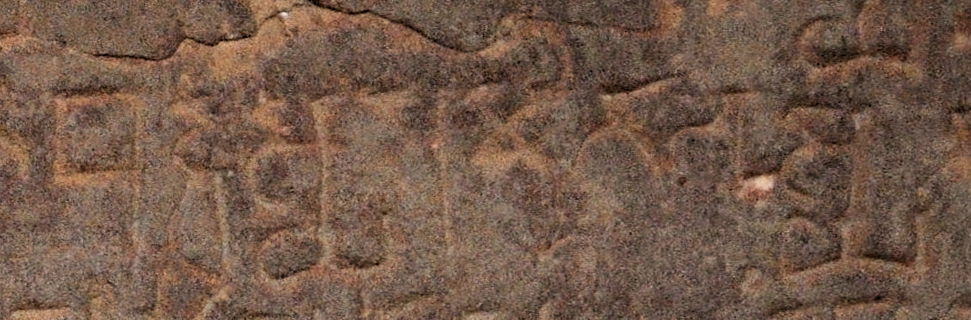
Inscribed pedestal with the first known occurrence of the name of "Amitābha Buddha" in "the year 26 of Huvishka" (153 CE, first year of Huvishka) In Brahmi script in the inscription:

"𑀩𑀼𑀤𑁆𑀥𑀲𑁆𑀬 𑀅𑀫𑀺𑀢𑀸𑀪𑀲𑁆𑀬"
"Bu-ddha-sya A-mi-tā-bha-sya"
"Of the Buddha Amitabha"
Art of Mathura, Mathura Museum

The first known epigraphic evidence for Amitābha is the bottom part of a statue found in Govindnagar, Pakistan and now located at Government Museum, Mathura. The statue is dated to "the 26th year of the reign of Huviṣka" i.e., 104 CE. It is a work of Kushan art, made during the Kushan Empire (30–375 CE), and was dedicated to "Amitābha Buddha" by a family of merchants.

Gregory Schopen translates the inscription as follows:

The 26th year of the Great King Huveṣka, the 2nd month, the 26th day. On this day by Nāgarakṣita, the (father) of the trader (Sax-caka), the grandson of the merchant Balakatta, the (son of Buddhapila), an image of the Blessed One, the Buddha Amitābha was set up for the worship of all buddhas. Through this root of merit (may) all living things (obtain) the unexcelled knowledge of a buddha.

Another early epigraphic mention of Amitabha (c. 610 CE) is found in Patan (Lalitpur). It is a verse which states: "I praise Amitabha, the best, dispeller of illusion by the light of great prajña. The light, victor who lives in Sukhavati with Lokesvara, the destroyer of the fear arising in the world, bearer of the lotus, and Mahasthamaprapta, the affectionate-hearted one." Another example is found in a caitya in a courtyard of Tyagal Tol in Patan which has been dated to the late sixth or early seventh century and mentions the classic Amitabha triad. It states:

I always venerate Amitabha, the Sun-like Jina, in the world of Sukhavati, who has destroyed the darkness of the great illusion of existence with the light of great wisdom; Mahasthamaprapta, whose mind is affectionately disposed due to [unlimited] compassion, and Lokesa, who holds a lotus and wards off the dangers of arising in the world.

One of the last Indian sculptures of Amitābha can be found in the trademark black stone of the Pala Empire (c. 750–1161 CE), which was the last Buddhist empire of India. The appearance of sculptural remains dating to the end of the second century suggests that Amitābha was becoming popular in the first and second centuries CE in Gandhara and Central Asia. Apart from the Gandhara region, not much evidence has been found for extensive Amitabha worship in the rest of the Indian subcontinent before the 8th century. During the 8th century, the Chinese monk Cimin Huiri visited India and learned about Pure Land Amitabha devotion there.

From its initial home in Greater Gandhāra, Amitābha worship and its images quickly spread via the Silk road to Central Asian kingdoms like Khotan, and then to China as well as Southeast Asian regions like Indonesia. The earliest dated Amitābha image in China is from the Longmen Grottoes and is dated to 519 CE. During the Sui Dynasty (581–618) and the succeeding Tang dynasty, China saw a growth in the creation of Amitabha images and paintings. Some exemplary Amitabha art from this period can be found in Dunhuang.

== In East Asian Buddhism ==
=== Chinese Buddhism ===
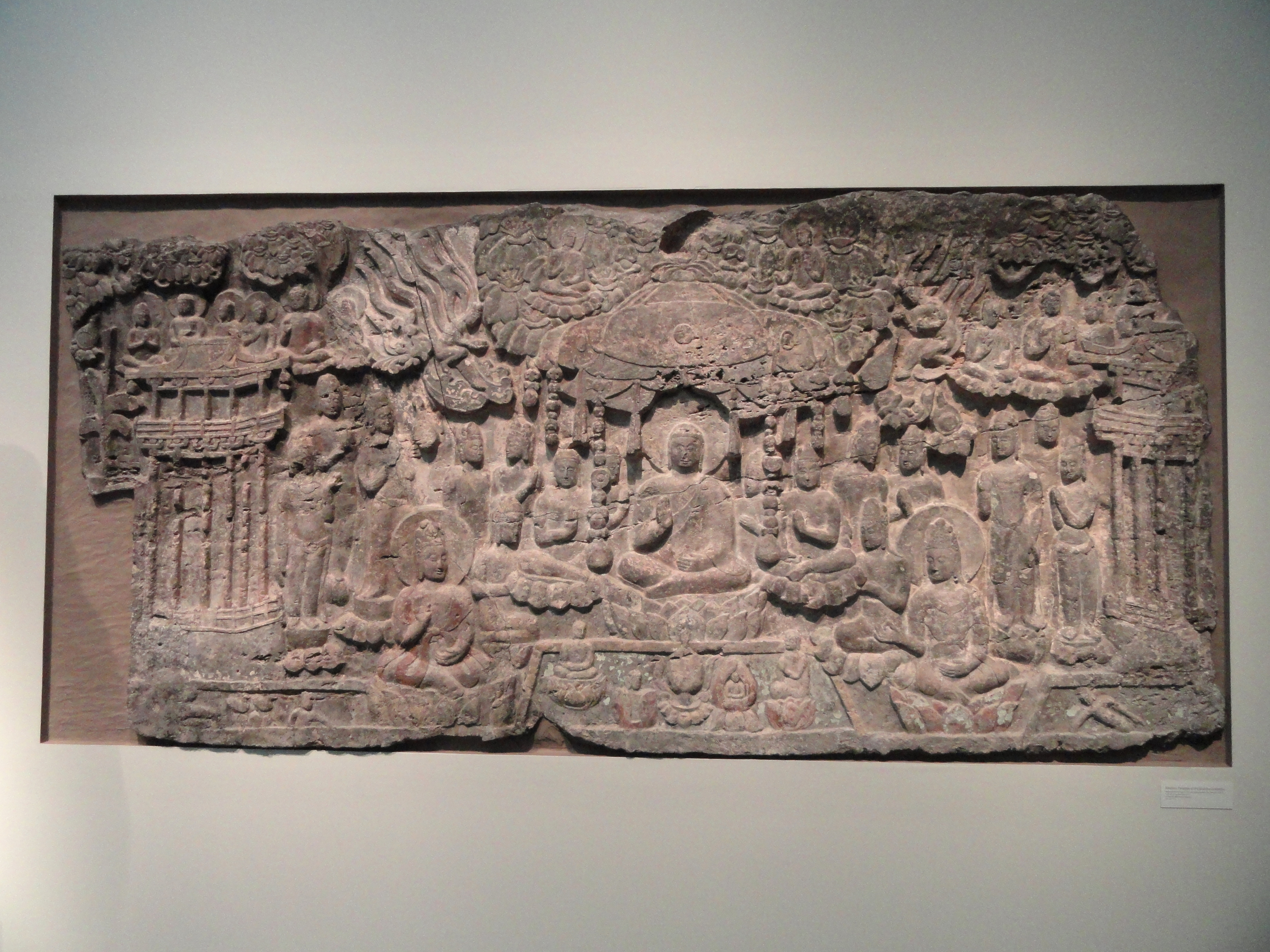
Western Paradise of the Buddha Amituo, Hebei province, c. 550–577 CE

Amitābha is one of the most important Buddhas in Chinese Buddhism. Some of the earliest evidence for Amitābha devotion is found in the works of Zhi Dun (314–366), a Neo-Daoist convert to Buddhism. The Chinese translations of Kumārajīva (344–413 CE), Buddhabhadra (359–429 CE), and others introduced the main Pure Land Sutras to Chinese Buddhists.

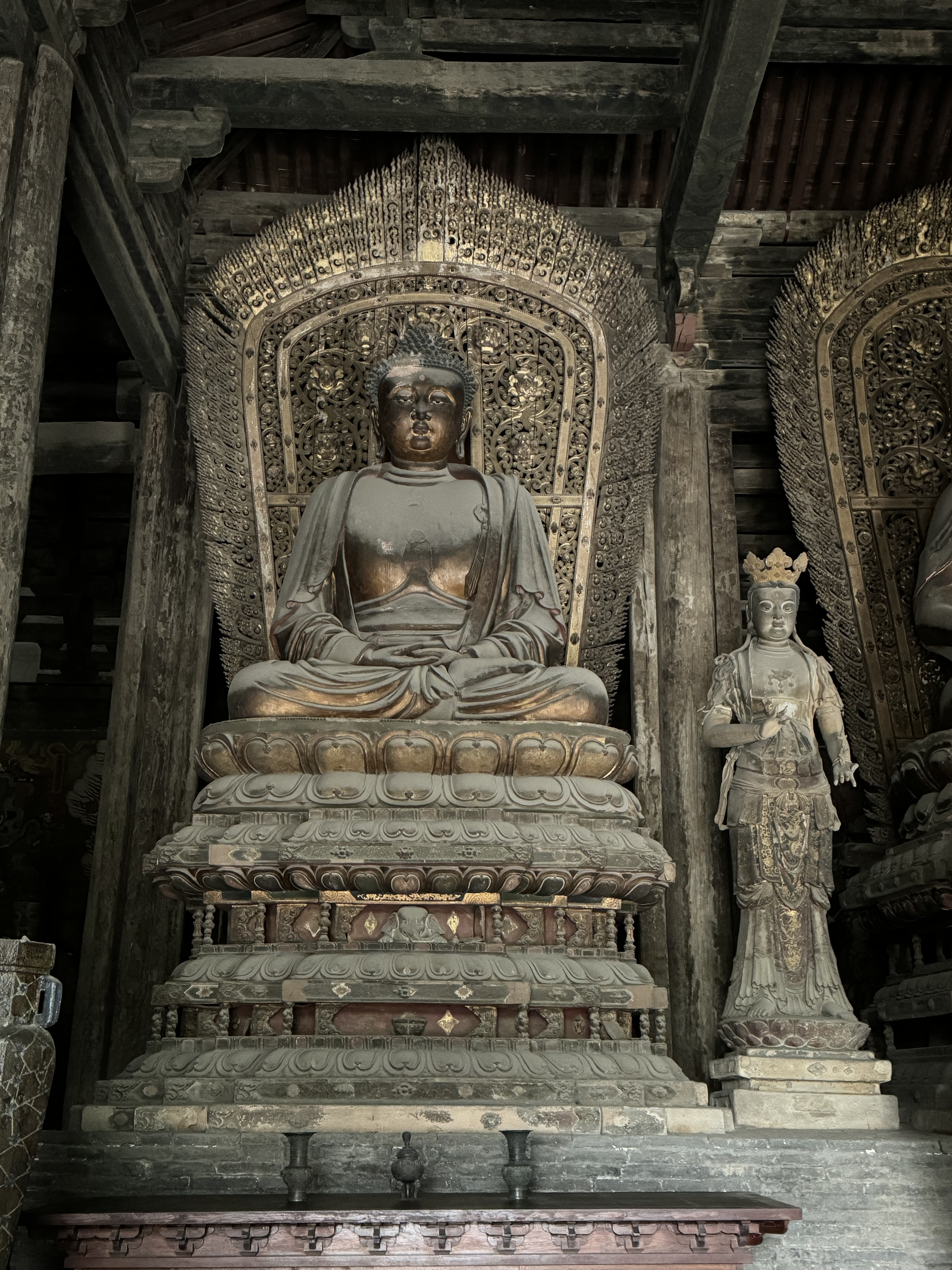
Jin Dynasty statue of Amituo as one of the Five Tathagathas at Shanhua Temple, Shanxi, China

In China, "Buddha recollection" (Skt: buddhānusmṛti, Ch: nianfo) based on Amitābha became the central practice of Pure Land Buddhism, a tradition which developed gradually through the writings and teachings of several key Chinese monks that lived from the Northern Wei (386–534) period to the Tang dynasty (618 to 907). Key figures in this tradition include Tanluan (476–554), Daochuo (562–645), Shandao (613–681), Huaigan (c. 7th century) and Fazhao (746–838). These Pure Land masters promoted and defended the view that any type of person could reach Amitābha's Pure Land (and immediately attain the state of non-retrogression) through relatively easy and accessible practices like reciting or chanting Amitābha's name. They argued that this practice was effective due to Amitābha's compassionate Other Power, which was the dominant cause for one's birth in the pure land (where one could attain Buddhahood much more swiftly and easily). This made Amitābha centered Pure Land Buddhism a very popular practice among laypeople and commoners who did not have the time for extensive meditation or other Buddhist practices.

Regarding the nature of Amitābha Buddha himself, Pure Land masters like Daochuo and Shandao argued that Amitābha was a saṃbhogakāya (self-enjoyment body) Buddha. This view ran counter to the previously popular idea which saw Amitābha as a nirmāṇakāya (transformation body) Buddha, like Shakyamuni Buddha.

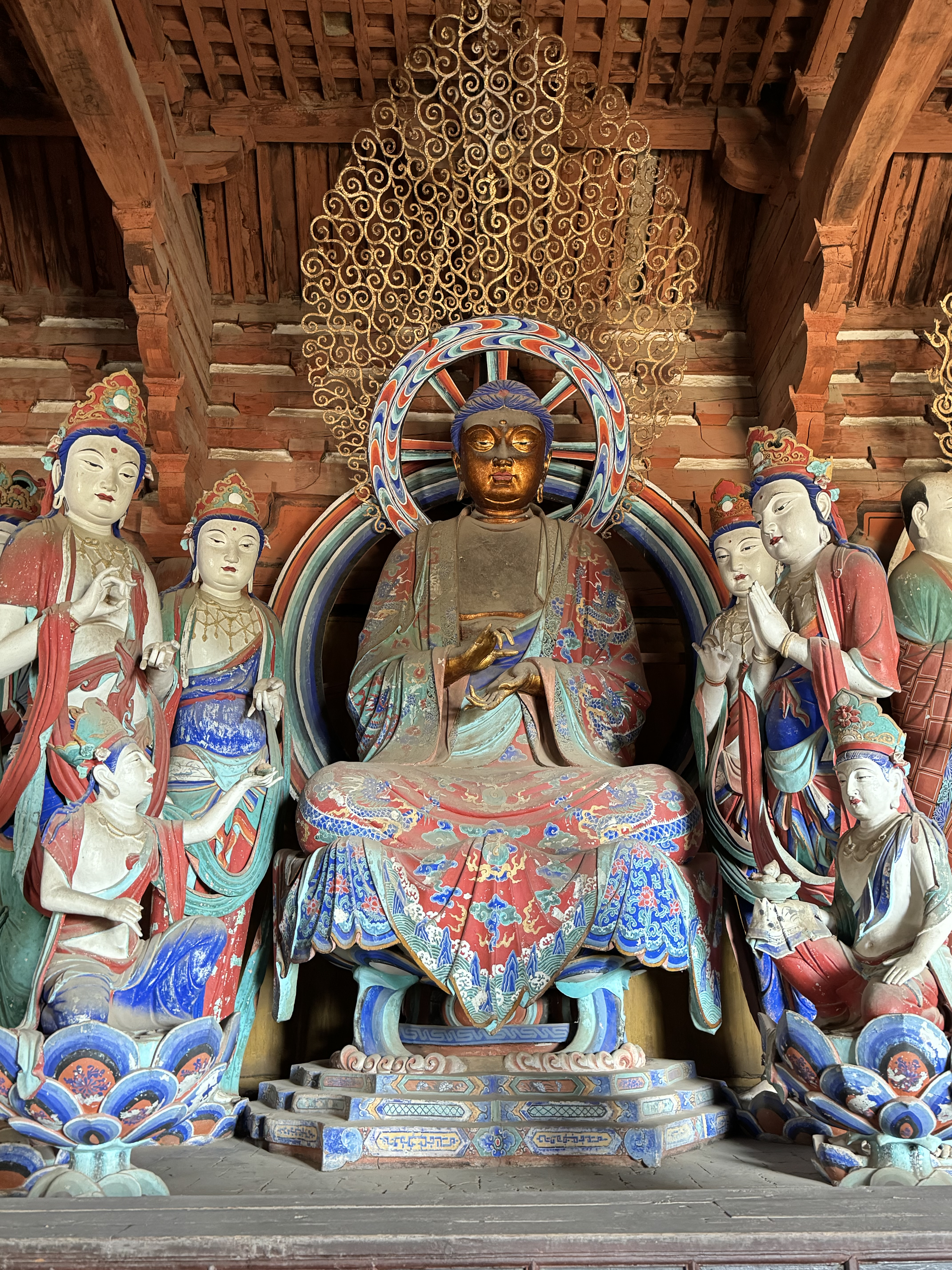
Tang dynasty (618–907) statues of Amituo surrounded by attendant bodhisattvas at Foguang Temple in Wutai, Shanxi, China.

A saṃbhogakāya is a divine body associated with more transcendent Buddhas which are beyond the triple world and have unlimited lifespans. A nirmāṇakāya meanwhile is a form body which is more contingent and human-like (though still supramundane), and also has a limited lifespan and manifests a nirvana which appears as death or cessation. As such, saṃbhogakāyas have a higher ontological status in the classic Mahayana schema of the triple body (trikaya). Some Indian Mahayana works state that saṃbhogakāyas are only visible and accessible to bodhisattvas who have entered the bodhisattva stages. In spite of this, Shandao and other Pure Land masters affirmed that Amitābha and his pure land were a saṃbhogakāya and also that it was accessible to all kinds of beings. According to Shandao, this is only possible because of the great compassionate Other Power of Amitābha Buddha.

Amitābha devotion also became an important current within other Chinese Buddhist traditions, like the Tiantai, Sanlun, and Vinaya schools. During the Song dynasty (960–1279), Tiantai monks such as Shengchang, Ciyun Zunshi, and Siming Zhili, founded Pure Land societies which focused on the recitation of Amitābha's name. Later eras saw further doctrinal refinements of Chinese Amitābha devotion, with the writings of scholars like Yuan Hongdao (1568–1610) and Ouyi Zhixu (1599–1655). During the Qing dynasty (1644–1912), scholars of the Huayan school like Peng Shaosheng (1740–1796) also adopted and wrote on Amitābha devotion, identifying Amitābha Buddha with Vairocana, the cosmic Buddha of the Avatamsaka Sutra.

The recitation of Amitābha's name is a widespread practice among contemporary Chinese Buddhists (and other Buddhists in the East Asian mainland). This practice known as nianfo (念佛) in Chinese and nembutsu in Japanese and entails the recitation or chanting (melodic or monotone) of the phrase 南無阿彌陀佛 (Chinese: Namo Amituofo, Japanese: Namu Amida Butsu) which means "Homage to Amitābha Buddha". Aside from being a popular chant and meditation, this phrase is also seen as auspicious and is reproduced in many ways including calligraphy scrolls, public inscriptions, charms, amulets, altarpieces and electronic devices.

=== Japanese Buddhism ===
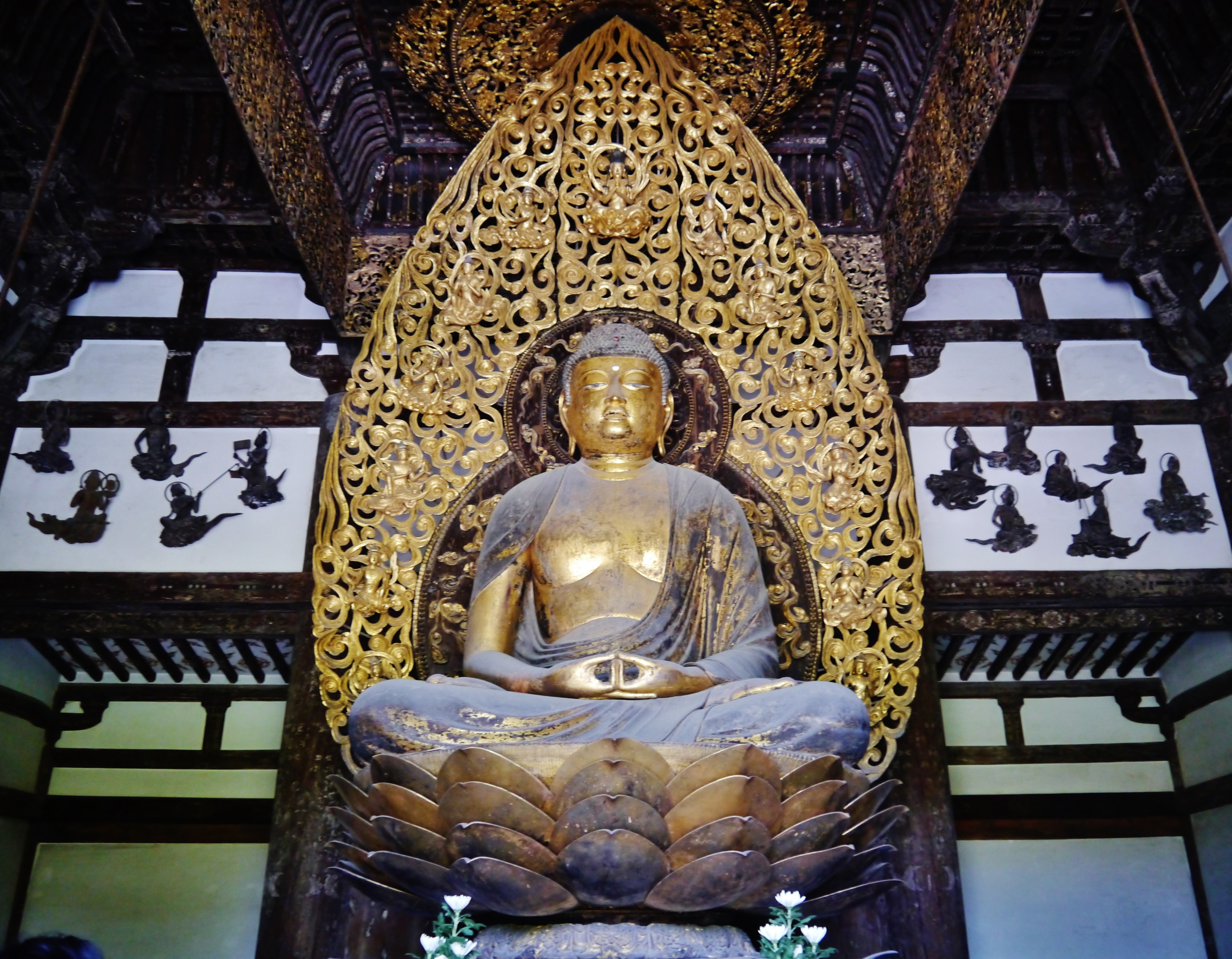
Amida Buddha at the Phoenix Hall of Byōdō-in, Uji, Japan

Amitābha also became a central figure for Japanese Buddhism. His worship became established on the island during the Nara period (710–794) and was it one of the main practices taught in the Tendai school during the Heian period (794–1185).

The popularity of Amitābha centered practices eventually led to the formation of independent Pure Land schools which focused on Amitābha exclusively. The Tendai monk Hōnen (1133–1212) was the most influential figure who led this Pure Land movement during the Kamakura period. Hōnen was converted to the Pure Land path through his reading of Shandao and the other Chinese masters and became a popular author and preacher, bringing many people to the Pure Land teaching. He argued that people should set aside other practices and focus on the simple recitation of Amitābha's name to gain birth in the pure land. Compared to the complex teachings of the other traditions of the time, this simpler approach to Buddhism was much more appealing to common laypeople. This led to an increase in Amitābha devotion among commoners.

Over time, these new Amitābha focused traditions established by Hōnen's followers (mainly Jōdo-shū, and Shinran's Jōdo Shinshū) became the largest Buddhist tradition in Japan and remain so to this day.

== In Vajrayāna Buddhism ==
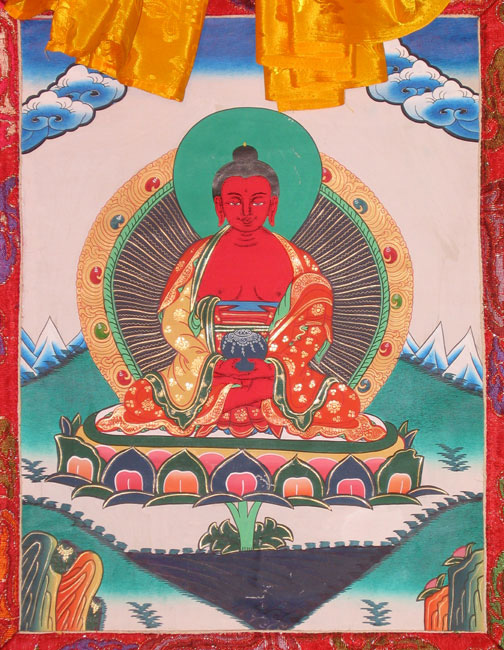
Buddha Amitābha in Tibetan Buddhism, traditional thangka painting

Amitābha remained an influential Buddha in the Vajrayāna Buddhist pantheon. He is considered one of the Five Tathagatas, together with Akshobhya, Amoghasiddhi, Ratnasambhava, and Vairocana. In this esoteric buddhological schema, Amitābha is seen as part of the Lotus Buddha Family, which is associated with the color red, the Western direction, the aggregate of perception (saṃjñā), the defilement of craving and the bījamantra "Hrih". In Buddhist esoteric scriptures, Amitābha is also said to have a wisdom consort, the female Buddha Pāṇḍaravāsinī.

Amitābha is an important figure in Tibet, Mongolia, Nepal, India and other regions where Tibetan Buddhism is practiced. In Tibetan Buddhist depictions, Amitābha appears with bodhisattvas Vajrapani and Avalokiteśvara, the former to his left and the latter to his right. There are numerous Tibetan Buddhist teachings and practice lineages which focus on attaining rebirth in the buddhafield of Amitābha. These include exoteric (or sutra) and esoteric (or tantric) practices. The composition of Amitābha focused works was popular among major Tibetan Buddhist figures such as Sakya Pandita, Dolpopa, Tsongkhapa and Karma Chagme.

In Tibetan Buddhism, Amitābha is clearly distinguished from Amitāyus (Measureless Life), while both names are used interchangeably in East Asian Buddhism. Tibetan Buddhism sees Amitāyus as an enjoyment body (saṃbhogakāya) while Amitābha is seen as a manifestation body.

Japanese depiction of the Amida Triad in Seed Syllable form (Siddham Script)

Birth in Amitābha's Sukhavati remains an important goal for many Tibetan Buddhists, especially laypersons who commonly revere Amitabha, Avalokiteshvara and Padmasambhava as three bodies of a single Buddha. Amitābha is invoked during the yogic death practice called phowa ("transference of consciousness at the time of death"). Furthermore, Amitāyus is also commonly invoked in practices relating to longevity and preventing an untimely death. In Tibetan Buddhism, Amitāyus is also one of the three deities of long life (Amitāyus, White Tara and Uṣṇīṣavijayā). Amitāyus being a compound of amita ("infinite") and āyus ("life"), and so means "he whose life is boundless".

The Panchen Lamas and the Shamarpas are considered to be emanations of Amitābha.

In Japanese Shingon Buddhism, Amitābha is included as part of the thirteen Buddhas. Amitābha is associated with the Diamond Realm (vajradhātu), whereas Amitāyus is associated with the Womb Realm (garbhakoṣadhātu). Shingon, like Tibetan Buddhism, also uses special devotional mantras for Amitābha, though the mantras used differ. Amitābha is also one of the Buddhas featured in the Womb Realm Mandala used in Shingon practices, and sits to the west, which is where the Pure Land of Amitābha is said to dwell.

=== Mantras ===
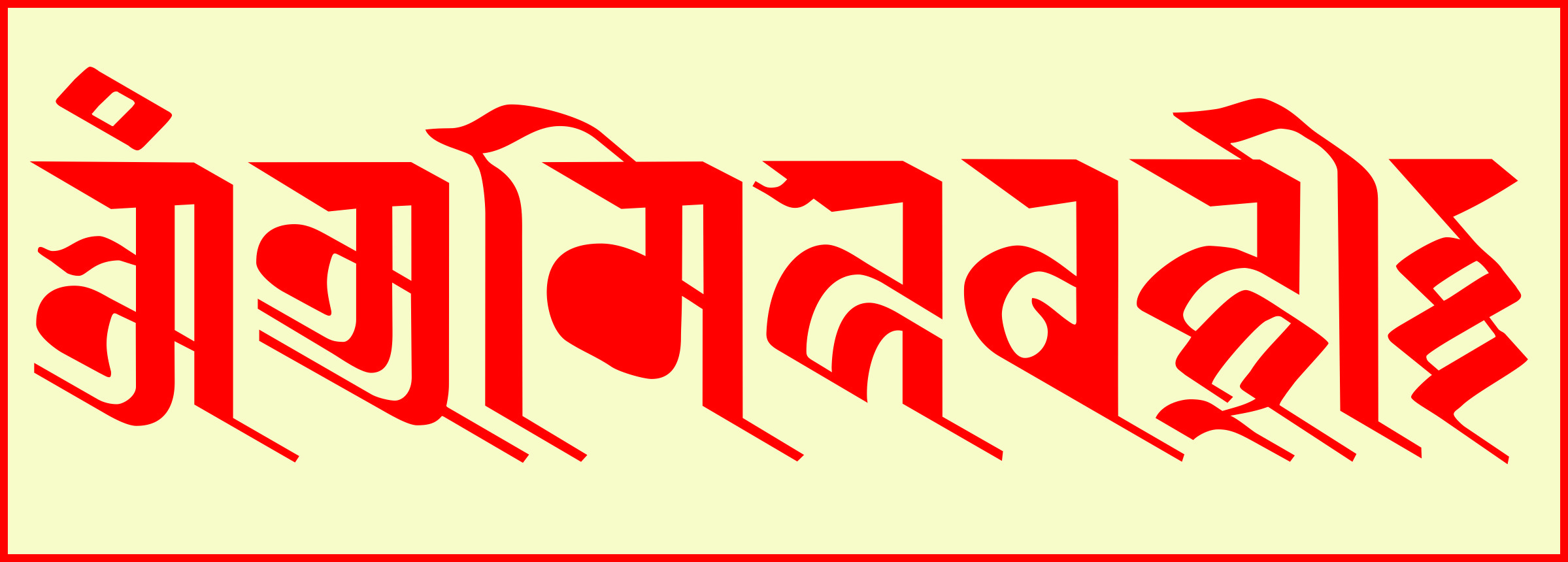
Om ami dewa hri mantra in the Lantza script

In Esoteric Buddhism, Amitābha Buddha has various mantras associated with him. His main seed syllable mantra is hrīḥ.

In Chinese Buddhism, Amitābha is popularly associated with two mantras: the Amitabha Pure Land Rebirth Dharani and the Dhāraṇī of the Holy Tathāgata of Immeasurable Lifespan, King of Determined Radiance, both of which are part of a grouping of mantras called the Ten Small Mantras that are commonly chanted during morning and evening liturgical sessions in Chinese Buddhist monasteries.

In Tibetan Buddhism, the main mantra of Amitābha is Om ami dewa hri (Sanskrit: oṃ amideva hrīḥ). This is an alternative form of oṃ amitābha hrīḥ.

Amitabha's main mantra in Shingon Buddhism is Om amirita teizei kara um (Japanese: オン・アミリタ・テイゼイ・カラ・ウン), which represents the underlying Sanskrit form: oṃ amṛta-teje hara hūṃ.

== Names ==
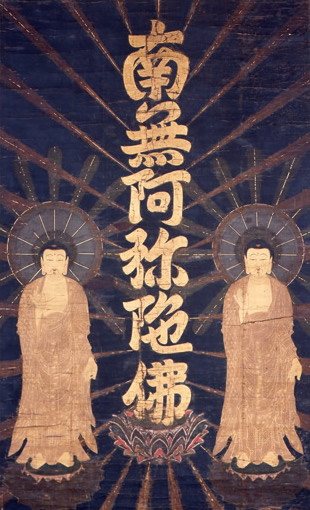
Six-character Name (Jp: "Namo Amida Butsu") with Images of Sakyamuni and Amida, Manpuku-ji, Osaka, Japan

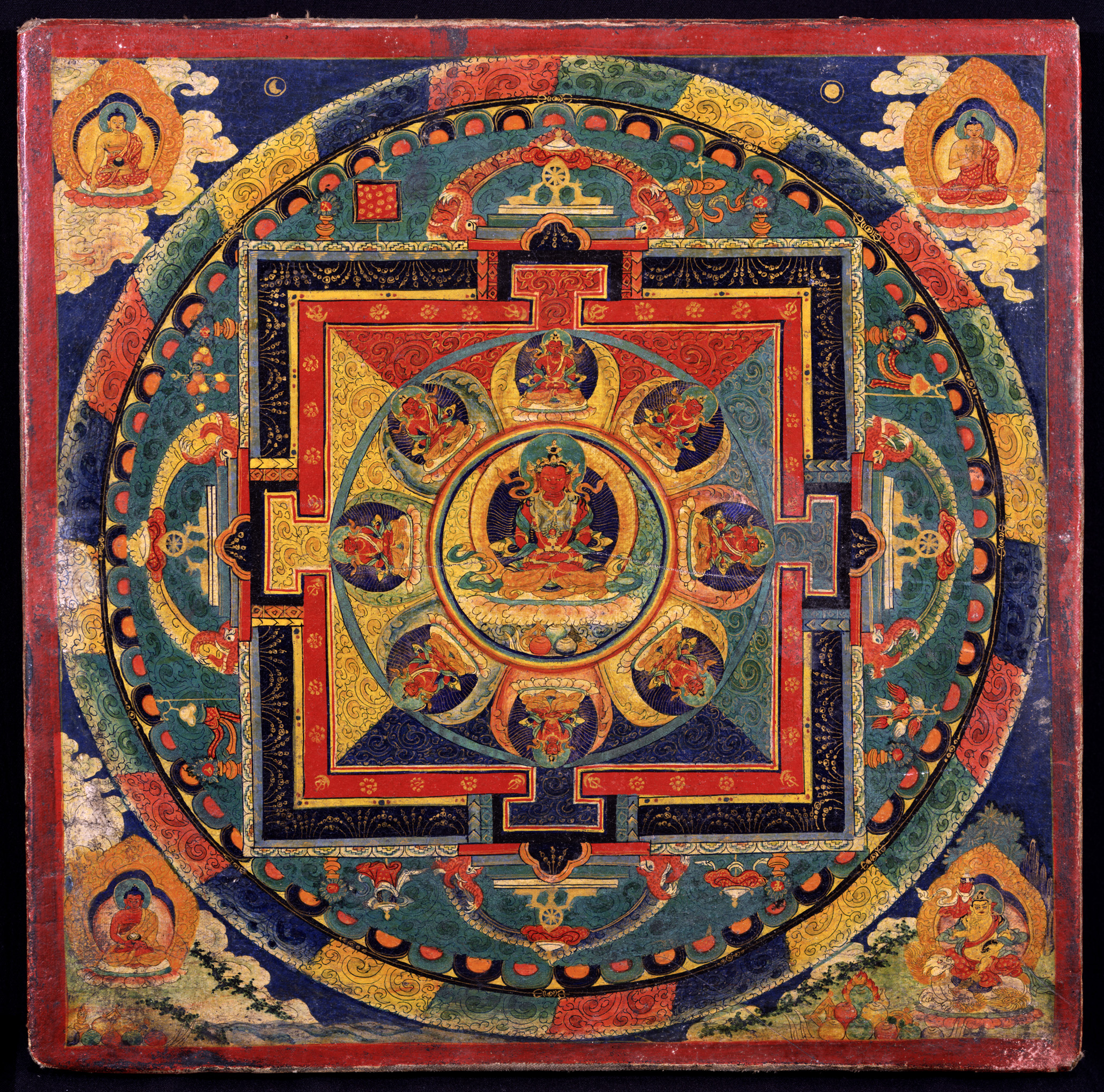
Mandala of Amitāyus, Tibet, 19th century, Rubin Museum of Art

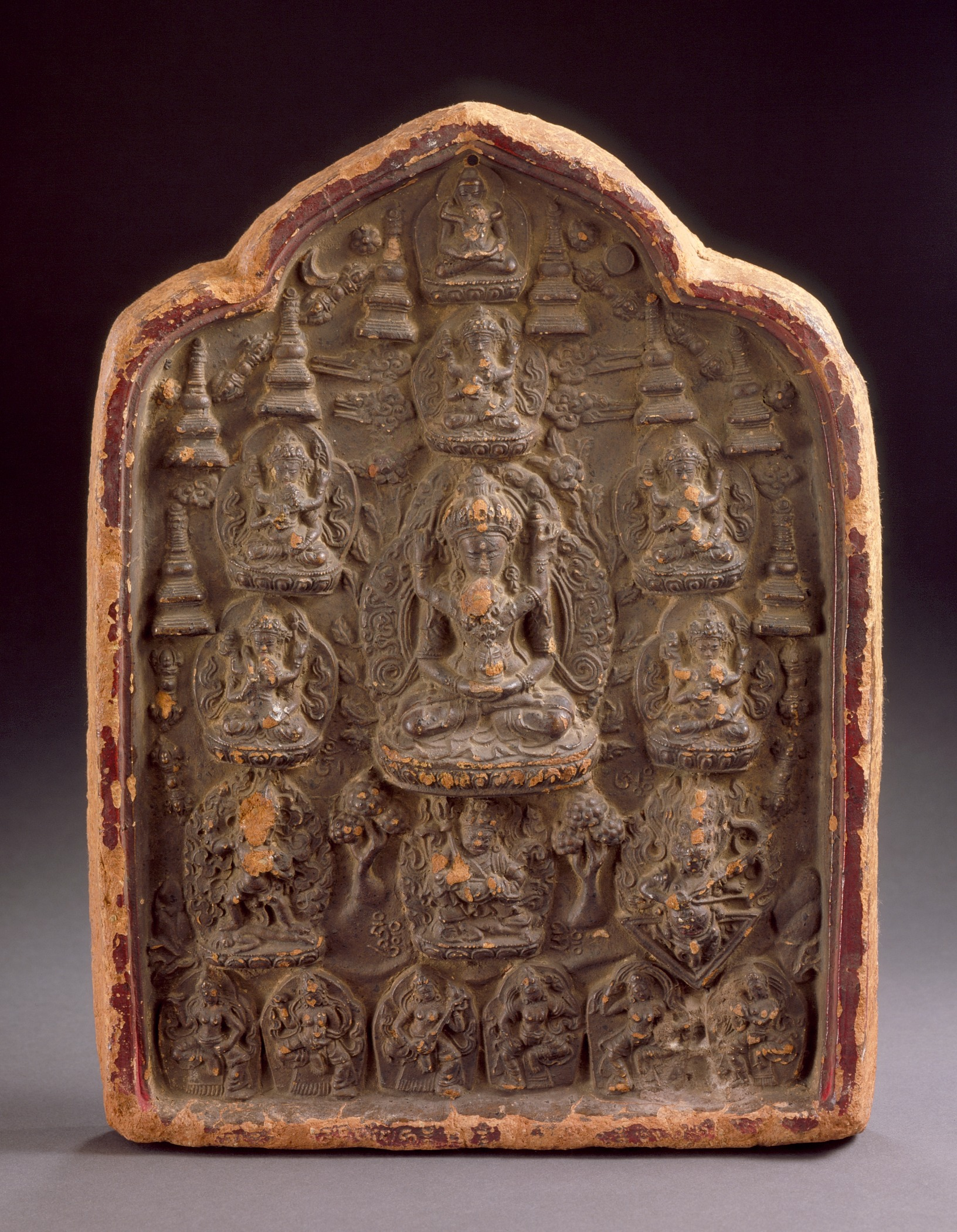
Mandala of Amitayus, in union with tantric consort

The proper form of Amitābha's name in Sanskrit is Amitābha, masculine, and the nominative singular is Amitābhaḥ. This is a compound of the Sanskrit words amita ("without bound, without limit") and ābhā ("light, splendor"). Consequently, the name literally means boundless light or limitless light. The name Amitāyus (nominative form Amitāyuḥ) means limitless life, from the Sanskrit ayus.

In Chinese, the most common name is 阿彌陀佛, which is pronounced "Ēmítuófó" or "Amítuófó" in modern Chinese. The Chinese 阿彌陀佛 is either a transliteration of the Sanskrit "Amitābha" or possibly the Prakrit form "Amidā'a". It is not, according to Jan Nattier, a transliteration of "Amita" ("Limitless") alone. "Fo" (佛) is the Chinese word for "Buddha". This transliteration goes back to the early translations of Lokaksema. Vietnamese, Korean, and Japanese traditionally use the same Chinese characters, though they are pronounced differently (Japanese: Amida Butsu, Korean: Amita Bul, A Di Đà Phật).

In addition to transliteration, the name Amitābha was also been translated into Chinese using characters. One of the earliest such translations was 無量 Wúliàng ("Limitless"). This was also used in longer names like "Infinite Light" (Wúliàngguāng 無量光) and "Infinite Purity" (Wúliàng Qīngjìng 无量清净, possibly from the Prakrit *Amidā'a-viśuha). In the same fashion, the name Amitāyus ("Infinite Life") has been translated as 無量壽 (Wúliàngshòu), though this appears at a later date than the Amitābha derived names. These translated names are not, however, very commonly used.

In Japanese, Amitābha is also called Amida Nyorai (Japanese: 阿弥陀如来; "the Tathāgata Amitābha").

In esoteric Buddhist texts, Amitābha is often called Amṛta (甘露, or 甘露王, lit. sweet-dew king).

In Tibetan, Amitābha is called འོད་དཔག་མེད་ Wylie: 'od dpag med, THL: Öpakmé and Amitāyus is translated as ཚེ་དཔག་མེད་ Wylie: tshe dpag med, THL: Tsépakmé.

Apart from these standard names, numerous other sources contain other names of Amitāyus. Alternative names include:

- Aparimitāyus (Unlimited Life),
- Aparimitāyur-jñāna (Unlimited Life and Wisdom),
- Vajraāyuṣa (Vajra Life),
- Amṛta-dundubhisvararāja (King of the Drum of Immortality),
- Aparimitāyurjñānasuviniścitatejorāja (The Blazing King Who Is Completely Certain of Immeasurable Longevity and Wisdom).

=== Significance of the Name ===
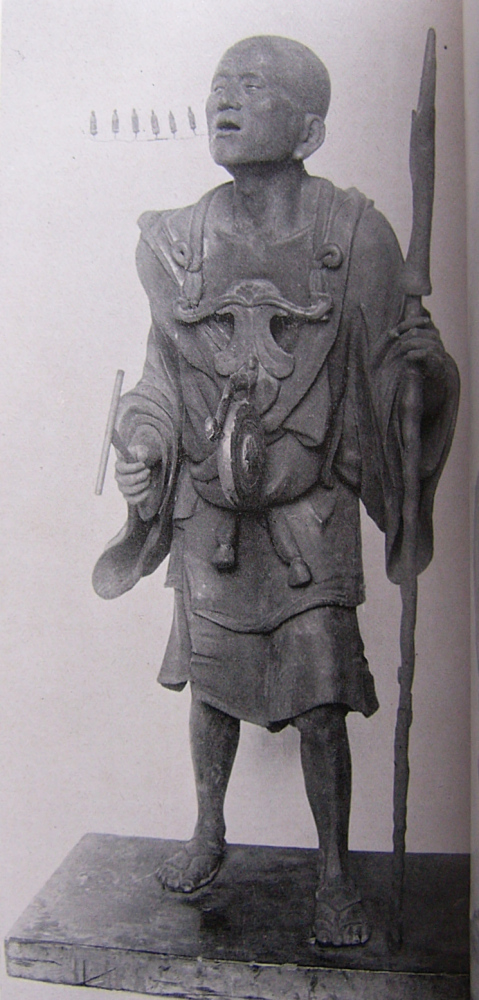
A sculpture of the Japanese itinerant monk Kūya reciting the nembutsu. Each Chinese characters of the Name is represented by a small Amida figure emerging from his mouth.

Pure Land Buddhism places profound significance on "the Name" (Ch: 名号 mínghào, Jp: myōgō) of Amitābha, which is central to Pure Land doctrine and practice. According to patriarch Daochuo, the Name is the essence of Amitābha Buddha's Vow to save all sentient beings. According to the Seventeenth and Eighteenth Vows in the Infinite Life Sutra, Amida vowed that his Name would be praised by all Buddhas and that anyone who recites it with faith will be assured of birth in the Pure Land. Also, according to Pure Land figures like Tanluan and Shinran, the Name is not merely a conventional label or word, but embodies the totality of Amida's virtue, wisdom, and compassion. Since the Buddha infused the Name with all of his power and virtues, it is the most accessible means for ordinary beings to tap into Buddha's other-power and attain liberation.

The Name is also seen as an expression of Thusness (Dharmakaya), serving as a bridge between the ultimate reality of Buddhahood and the limited experience of ordinary beings. Tanluan and Shinran emphasized that the Name is not an empty linguistic signifier but the very manifestation of Amida's Wisdom and Compassion. It is Amitābha himself in the form of sound. Through the Name, Amida communicates with sentient beings, making his presence tangible and accessible. Shinran also argues that the Name is inseparable from the Dharma-nature itself, meaning that reciting "Namu-Amida-Butsu" is not merely an act of devotion, but a direct engagement with the ultimate truth.

The Name also plays a crucial role in the awakening of faith (shinjin) in practitioners. Pure Land teachers like Shinran taught that faith is not something generated by the individual but is received through the Name. The Name acts as the medium through which Amida's compassion is transferred to the practitioner, transforming their mind and aligning it with the Dharma. This process underscores the Name's dual function, being the means of salvation and the expression of Amida's Vow. To illustrate the power of the name, the Chinese patriarch Tanluan compares the Buddha's name to a bright light which can instantly illuminate a pitch black room, even if that room has been dark for eons.

Tanluan also writes:

If all who hear the meritorious Name of Amitabha but have faith in, and take joy in what they have heard, and if for one instant of thought they have utmost sincerity, and if they transfer these merits and desire rebirth, then they shall attain rebirth [in the pure land].

=== The Lights of Amitābha ===
The Longer Sukhāvatīvyūha Sūtra contains twelve or more epithets of Amitābha Buddha which are also called "Buddha's lights". Vasubandhu's Treatise on Birth in the Pure Land references these "lights of Amitābha". These "Buddha lights" were seen as manifestations of Amitābha Buddha in Chinese Buddhism. The recitation of these names were also taught by Chinese Pure Land figures like Shandao.

There are various sets of these names found in different sources, which include Infinite Life Sutra, the Mahāratnakūṭa Sūtra (Dà bǎo jī jīng), and the Tathāgatācintyaguhyanirdeśa Sūtra.

The Infinite Life sutra lists twelve names of Amitābha:

1. 無量光 (Wúliàng guāng) – Boundless light
2. 無邊光 (Wúbiān guāng) – Unlimited Light
3. 無礙光 (Wú'ài guāng) – Unobstructed Light or Irresistible Light
4. 無對光 (Wúduì guāng) – Incomparable Light
5. 燄王光 (Yànwáng guāng) – King of Blazing Light (or Flame-king light)
6. 清浄光 (Qīngjìng guāng) – Pure Light
7. 歡喜光 (Huānxǐ guāng) – Joyful Light
8. 智慧光 (Zhìhuì guāng) – Light of Wisdom
9. 不断光 (Bùduàn guāng) – Uninterrupted Light or Unending Light
10. 難思光 (Nánsī guāng) – Inconceivable Light
11. 無構光 (Wúgòu guāng) – Indescribable light
12. 超日月光 (Chāo rìyuè guāng) – Light Surpassing the Sun and Moon

The surviving Sanskrit edition of the Sutra of Infinite Life meanwhile has a different list with eighteen names:

1. Tathāgato Amitābha – The Tathāgata of Infinite Light
2. Amitaprabha – Immeasurable Radiance
3. Amitaprabhāso – Unbounded Radiance
4. Asamāptaprabha – Unending Radiance
5. Asaṃgataprabha – Inconceivable Radiance
6. Prabhāśikhotsṛṣṭaprabha – [The one with a] splendorous crest which emits radiance
7. Sādivyamaṇiprabha – [The one with] Divine Jewel Splendor
8. Apratihataraśmirāgaprabha – [The one with] light rays that are unobstructed and radiant
9. Rājanīyaprabha – King Radiance
10. Premaṇīyaprabha – Lovable Radiance
11. Pramodanīyaprabha – Joyful Radiance
12. Saṃgamanīyaprabha – Harmonious Radiance
13. Upoṣaṇīyaprabha – Worshipful Radiance
14. Nibandhanīyaprabha – Unbreakable Radiance
15. Ativīryaprabha – Supremely vigorous radiance
16. Atulyaprabha – Incomparable Radiance
17. Abhibhūyanarendrāmūnnayendraprabha – Surpassing the splendor kings and gods
18. Śrāntasaṃcayendusūryajihmīkaraṇaprabha – Surpassing the splendor of the moon and stars

East Asian Buddhist commentators gave various interpretations and glosses of these different names. The 7th century Silla monk Kyŏnghŭng explains these names in his Commentary on the Larger Sutra, where he expands on the work of earlier commentators. Kyŏnghŭng's comments were adopted by the Japanese Pure Land founder Shinran who provides the following creative interpretation of Kyŏnghŭng's commentary in his Kyōgyōshinshō:

[Amida is called] "Buddha of immeasurable light": because it cannot be calculated. "Buddha of boundless light": because there is nothing it does not shine upon. "Buddha of unhindered light": because, with regard to human beings and things, there is nothing that obstructs it. "Buddha of in-comparable light": because it is beyond all bodhisattvas' lights. "Buddha of light who is lord of blazing light": because the radiance, being free and unrestricted, is unexcelled. "Buddha of pure light": because it is made manifest from the wholesome root that is free from greed, it rids sentient beings of their defilement of greed. Because it is free of the defilement of greed, it is "pure." "Buddha of joyful light": because it arises from the wholesome root that is free from anger, and thus can rid sentient beings of anger and rage. "Buddha of the light of wisdom": because, emerging from the mind of the wholesome root that is free from folly, it rids sentient beings of ignorance. "Buddha of uninterrupted light": because the Buddha's eternal light constantly illuminates and benefits beings. "Buddha of inconceivable light": because adherents of the two vehicles cannot fathom it. "Buddha of inexpressible light": because adherents of other vehicles [than the Buddha vehicle] cannot teach it. "Buddha of light excelling the sun and moon": because it shines constantly day and night, unlike the two lights of this Saha world. That all have their bodies touched by this light is due to the working of the "vow of softness and gentleness in body and mind."

== Iconography ==
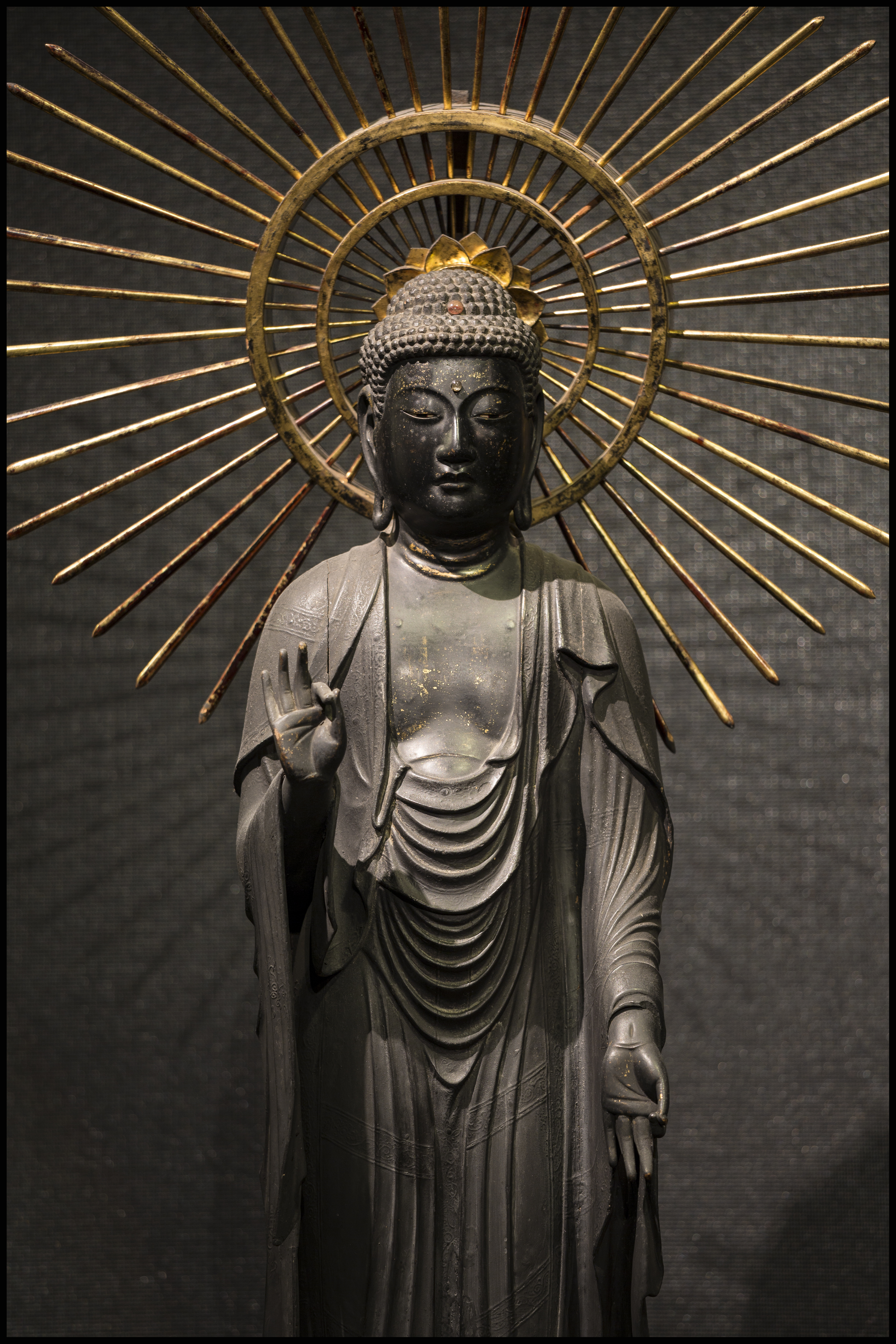
Standing Amida with light rays (48 in number, symbolizing his past vows), haloes and welcoming mudra, Museo d'arte orientale (Turin)

When depicted in the standing position (upon a lotus pedestal), Amitābha is often shown with left arm bare and extended downward with thumb and forefinger touching, with the right hand facing outward also with thumb and forefinger touching. This mudrā is called the "welcoming mudrā" (Jp: raigō), and it is a gesture welcoming all beings to Amida's Pure Land. It signifies that wisdom (symbolized by the raised hand) is accessible to even the lowest beings, while the outstretched hand shows that Amitābha's compassion is directed at the lowest beings, who cannot save themselves.

When depicted in the sitting posture, Amitābha is often shown displaying the meditation mudrā (thumbs touching and fingers together as in the Great Buddha of Kamakura at Kōtoku-in or welcoming mudrā. The earth-touching mudrā (right hand pointed downward over the right leg, palm inward) is reserved for a seated Shakyamuni Buddha alone.

Amitābha is said to display 84,000 auspicious and distinguishing marks reflecting his many virtues. Some common marks seen in art include rays of light (vyāmaprabhā), an aureole or large halo (prabhāvalī), his urna (spiral or circle in between his eyebrows), and a circular symbol (sometimes a swastika) on his chest (this is called Śrīvatsa).

In the artistic traditions of Vajrayana Buddhism, a distinction is made between Amitāyus (Buddha of Infinite Life) and Amitābha (Buddha of Infinite Light). These two figures are seen as identical in East Asian Buddhism and some sutras use both names interchangeably. However, in Tibetan Buddhism, they are iconographically distinct. Amitāyus is depicted in fine clothes, an ornate crown, and jewels. Amitābha is depicted in simple monk's clothing (kasaya).

== Triads and bodhisattva retinues ==
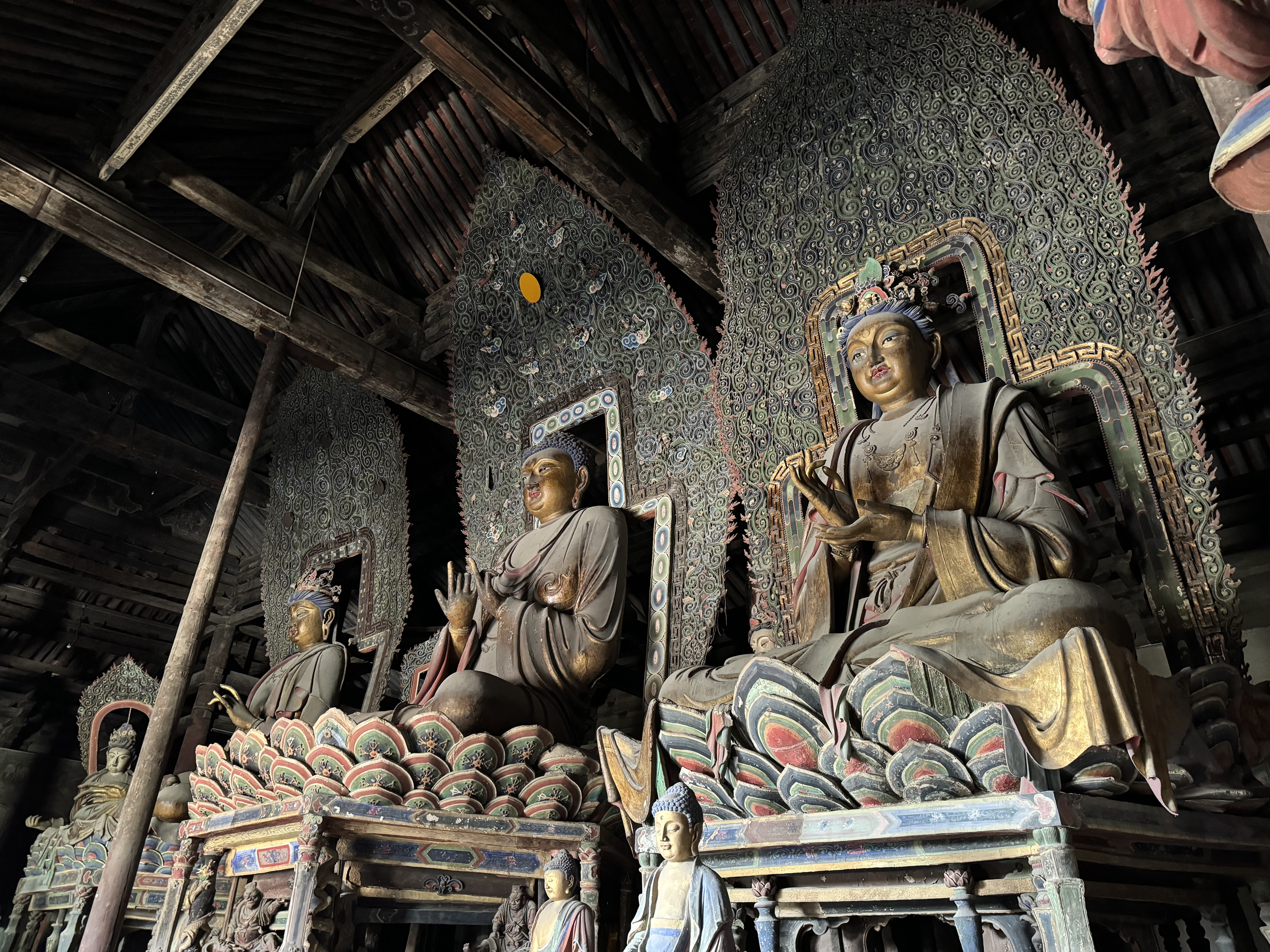
Ming dynasty (1368–1644) statues of the "Amitābha triad", consisting of Amituo, Guanyin and Dashizi, in Chongfu Temple^{[zh]} in Shanxi, China

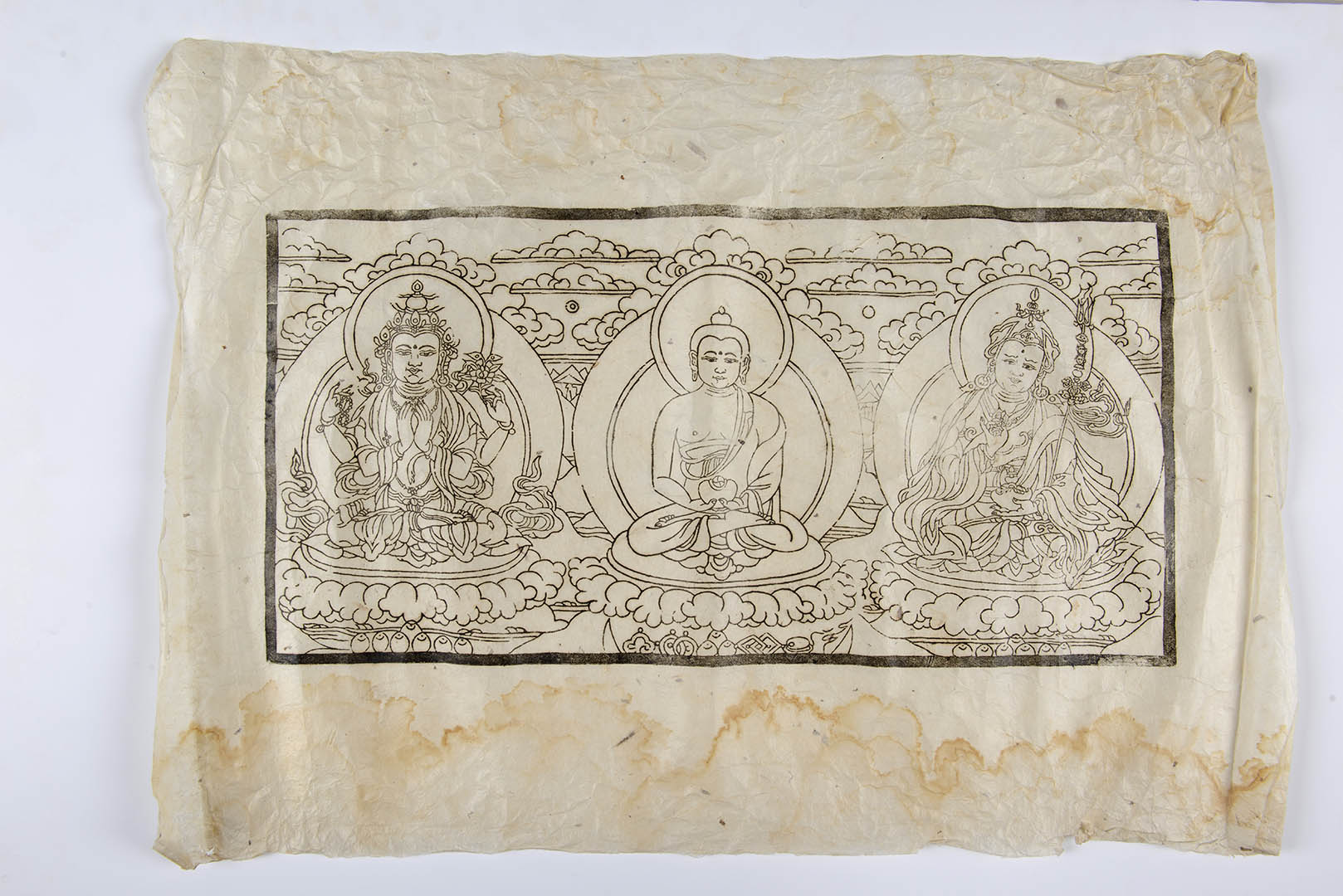
Tibetan Amitabha triad with Chenrezig and Padmasambhava

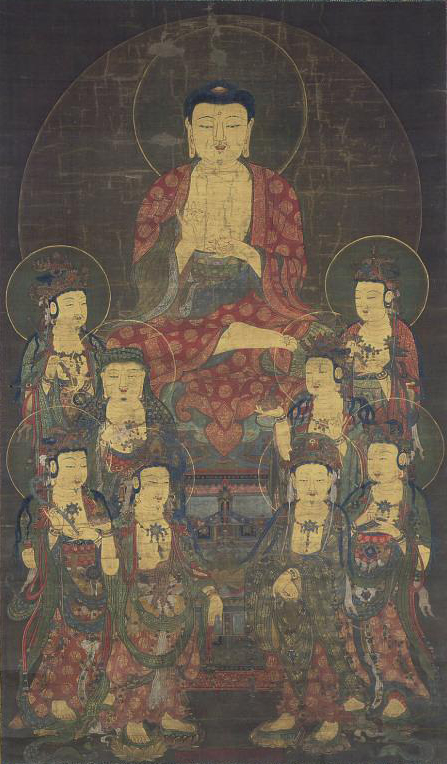
Goryeo (late 14th c.) Amitabha with Eight Great Bodhisattvas (Asian Art Museum, San Francisco)

Amitābha is often portrayed with two assistant bodhisattvas. In East Asian Buddhism, they are usually Avalokiteśvara on the right and Mahāsthāmaprāpta on the left. This convention is known as an "Amitābha triad". The Amitābha triad likely originated in Gandhara, and is especially common in Chinese, Japanese, and Korean art. Famous Japanese examples include the Yamada-den Amida Triad, Tachibana Shrine, and the Seiryō-ji Triad, all national treasures.

According to Katsumi Tanabe, Gandhāran Buddhist art also depicted Amitābha in four other lesser known triads:

- Maitreya/Amida/Avalokitasvara (the most numerous triad)
- Avalokitasvara/Amida/Maitreya
- Mañjuśrī/Amida/Avalokitasvara
- Mahāsthāmaprāpta/Amida/Maitreya

In Tibetan Buddhism, Mahāsthāmaprāpta is commonly replaced with Vajrapani or Padmasambhava.

Some East Asian depictions also show Amitābha with a larger group of bodhisattvas, either the eight great bodhisattvas or a host of twenty five bodhisattvas.

The names of the twenty five bodhisattvas are given in the Sūtra On Ten Methods Of Rebirth In Amitābha Buddha's Land (十往生阿弥陀佛国经) which states:

If [there] are sentient beings, [with] profound faith [in] this sūtra, [who are] mindful [of] Amitā[bha] Buddha (Āmítuófó), aspiring [to be] reborn, [in] his Land [Of] Ultimate Bliss, Amitā[bha] Buddha, [will] immediately send Contemplator [Of The] World's Sounds [Avalokiteśvara] Bodhisattva, Great Power Arrived [Mahāsthāmaprāpta] Bodhisattva, Medicine King [Bhaişajyarāja] Bodhisattva, Medicine Supreme [Bhaiṣajyasamudgata] Bodhisattva, Universal Virtue [Samantabhadra] Bodhisattva, Dharma Ease Bodhisattva, Lion's Roar Bodhisattva, Dhāraṇī Bodhisattva, Empty Space Treasury [Ākāśagarbha] Bodhisattva, Virtues' Treasury Bodhisattva, Treasures' Treasury Bodhisattva, Gold Treasury Bodhisattva, Vajra Bodhisattva, Mountain Ocean Wisdom Bodhisattva, Bright Light King Bodhisattva, Flower Adornment King Bodhisattva, All Treasures' King Bodhisattva, Moonlight King Bodhisattva, Sun Illumination King Bodhisattva, Samādhi King Bodhisattva, Ease King Bodhisattva, Great Ease King Bodhisattva, White Elephant King Bodhisattva, Great Majestic Virtues' King Bodhisattva, [and] Boundless Body Bodhisattva...

Descent paintings (known as "Raigō" in Japanese) showing Amitabha with a host of bodhisattvas coming to lead the dying to the pure land often show twenty five bodhisattvas playing music. One classic example is the national treasure Raigō of Amida and Twenty-Five Attendants.

== Goddesses associated with Amitābha ==
Numerous sources mention several feminine deities which are associated with Amitābha. These goddesses serve various roles as consorts, emanations, or personifications of the Buddha's qualities, and are invoked for protection, purification, and rebirth in the Pure Land of Sukhāvatī.

=== Pāṇḍaravāsinī ===
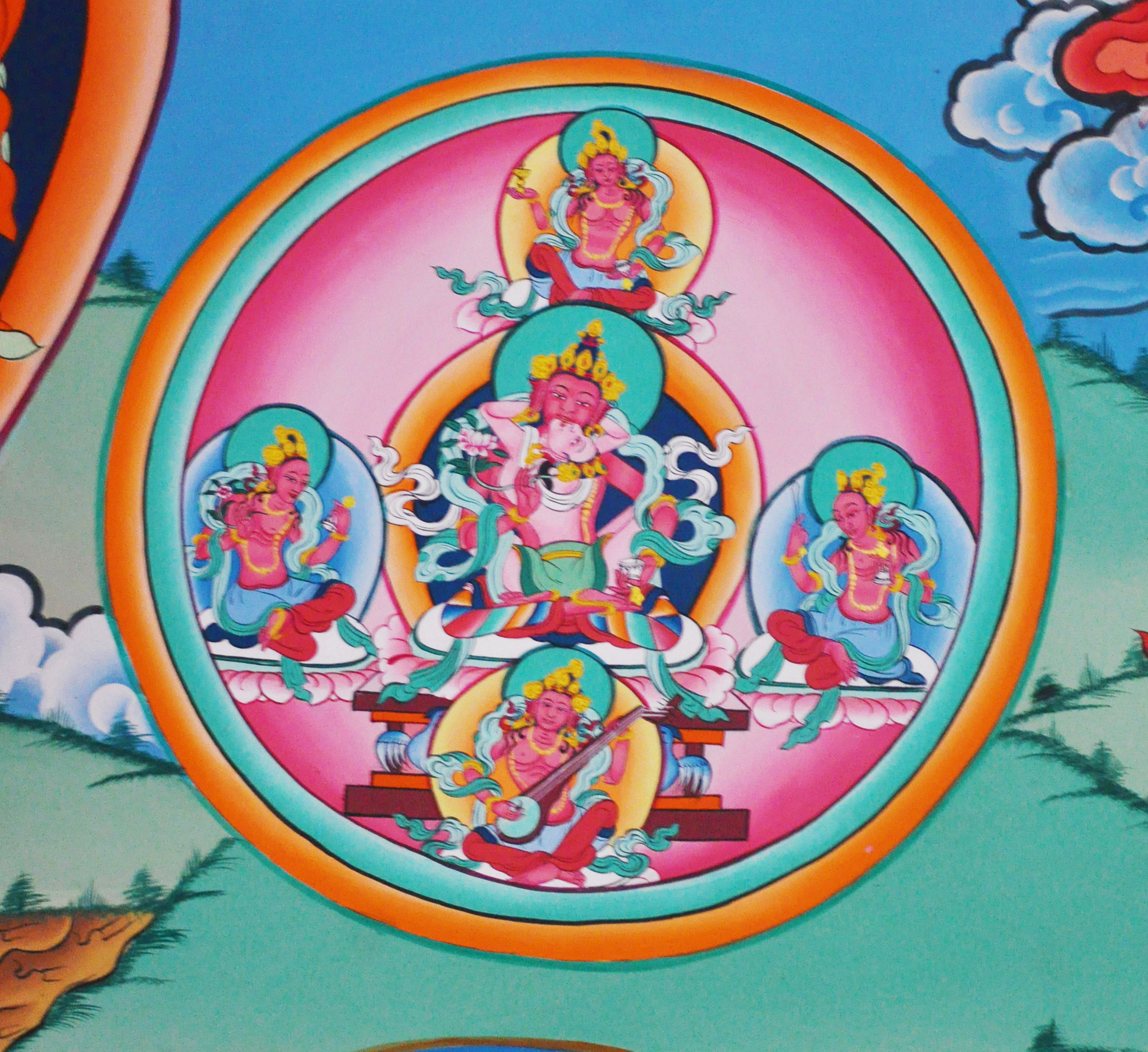
An esoteric depiction of Amitābha in union with his female consort Pāṇḍaravāsinī

Pāṇḍaravāsinī (Sanskrit; "She Who is Clad in White" or "She Who Dwells in White"), also known as simply Pāṇḍara, is the primary wisdom consort (prajñā) of Amitābha Buddha in esoteric Buddhist traditions. She is also known as Sitavāsinī, with sita also meaning "white" and symbolizing purity. In esoteric sources such as the Mañjuśrīmūlakalpa, Pāṇḍaravāsinī is described as the Śakti or wisdom queen (mahāvidyārājñī) of Amitābha. She is considered non-dual with Amitābha and represents his wisdom aspect. There are various mantras associated with this deity. For example, the Sovereign Ritual of Amoghapāśa gives the following mantra: oṁ padme pāṇḍaravāsini kuṇḍa kuṇḍa svāhā.

The Vajrasekhara Sutra explicitly identifies Pāṇḍaravāsinī as "Avalokiteśvara-Mother", establishing her maternal relationship to the bodhisattva Avalokiteśvara. As the mother of the Lotus Family (Padmakula), she holds a significant position in the Five Buddha Family system. Pāṇḍaravāsinī is most commonly depicted with reddish skin and white garments, as red is the color traditionally assigned to the Lotus Family. Her seed syllable is Pāṃ. She is counted among the Five Buddha Mothers or Five Ḍākinīs—five female Buddhas partnered with the Five Tathāgatas. Pāṇḍaravāsinī appears in numerous esoteric Buddhist texts, including: the Amoghapāśakalparāja, Mañjuśrīmūlakalpa, Susiddhikāra Sūtra and the Vajrasekhara Sutra.

=== Avalokiteśvara-mātā ===
The Āryāvalokiteśvara-mātā-nāma-dhāraṇī Sutra also mentions a dhāraṇī and a goddess named Mother of Avalokiteśvara (Sanskrit: Avalokiteśvara-mātā). This text was translated into Tibetan and also into Chinese by Fǎxián (法賢, 973-1001) as the Fo shuo guanzizai pusa mu tuoluoni jing (觀自在菩薩母陀羅尼經, Taishō 1117). According to the sutra, this dhāraṇī was originally taught in Sukhāvatī by a bodhisattva and brought to the human realm by Samantabhadra. The text promises that practitioners who recite the dhāraṇī during the three periods of the day will see Samantabhadra within seven days, and those who recite it mentally with single-pointed focus will see both the goddess herself and Amitābha Buddha within one month. The practice is said to grant irreversible progress toward awakening, memory of past lives, retention of teachings, and prosperity. While some Tibetan traditions identified Avalokiteśvara-mātā with Tārā, this interpretation might be considered from a mundane point of view to conflict with Tārā's own origin myth as being born from Avalokiteśvara's tears. The goddess is more likely connected to Pāṇḍaravāsinī, who is also called "Avalokiteśvara's Mother" in the Vajrasekhara Sutra.

=== Mahāśītavatī ===
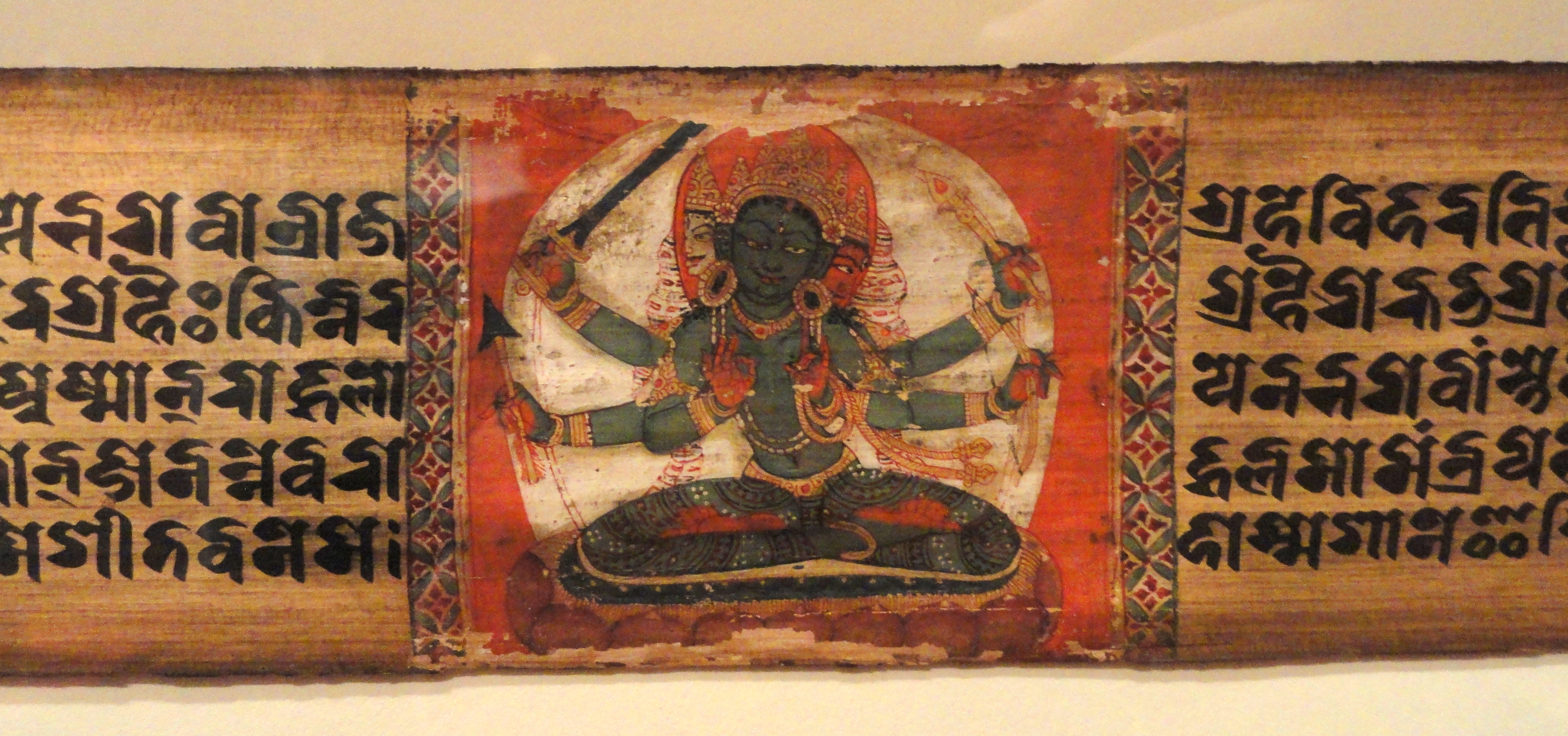
Pages from the prayer dedicated to the Goddess Mahasitavati, from a Pancharaksha Sutra

Mahāśītavatī (Sanskrit; "Great Cool One" or "Greatly Peaceful One") is one of the Five Protector Goddesses (Pañcarakṣā). Each of these goddesses is linked with one of the five Buddhas, and she is the one who emanates from Amitābha. She is mentioned in several important texts including the 5th-century Sādhanamālā, and the 11th-century Niṣpannayogāvalī of Abhayākara. According to the Sādhanamālā, she is red with four arms and has an image of Amitābha on her crown. She sits on a solar orb and glows like the sun.

As a Rakṣā (protector) goddess affiliated with Amitābha, Mahāśītavatī functions as a guardian deity invoked for protection and spiritual assistance. Her lotus symbol connects her to the Lotus Family of Amitābha. She is widely represented in Buddhist iconography across various Asian Buddhist countries and is known in Chinese collections under the title Śītavatī.

== See also ==
- Chan Buddhism
- Neo-Confucianism
- Yuzu Nembutsu

== Bibliography ==
- Jones, Charles B. (2019). Chinese Pure Land Buddhism, Understanding a Tradition of Practice. Honolulu: University of Hawai‘i Press.
- Jones, Charles B. (2021). Pure Land: History, Tradition, and Practice. Shambhala Publications. ISBN 978-1-61180-890-2
- Karashima, Seishi (2009), JSTOR 24049429 On Amitābha, Amitāyu(s), Sukhāvatī and the Amitābhavyūha], Bulletin of the Asia Institute, New Series, 23, 121–130
- Tanaka, Kenneth K. (1990). The Dawn of Chinese Pure Land Buddhist Doctrine: Ching-ying Hui-yüanʼs Commentary on the Visualization Sutra. Albany: State University of New York Press.
- Williams, Paul (2008). Mahayana Buddhism: The Doctrinal Foundations, Routledge.
