= Lokeśvararāja =

54th Buddha in Buddhist mythology

Lokeśvararāja was the 54th Buddha in the history of existence, according to the Larger Sutra of Immeasurable Life, long before Shakyamuni Buddha came and established what we know as Buddhism. He is known for teaching the Dharma to King Dharmakara, who was so impressed that he became a monk, and later achieved Enlightenment himself as Amitabha Buddha.

== Bibliography ==
- Inagaki Hisao, trans., Stewart, Harold (2003). The Three Pure Land Sutras, 2nd ed., Berkeley, Numata Center for Buddhist Translation and Research. ISBN 1-886439-18-4
