= Kenneth K. Tanaka =

Scholar, author, translator and ordained Jōdo Shinshū priest

Kenneth Ken'ichi Tanaka (born 1947), also known as Kenshin Tanaka or Ken'ichi Tanaka, is a scholar, author, translator and ordained Jōdo Shinshū priest. He is author and editor of many articles and books on modern Buddhism.

== Biography ==
Tanaka was born in 1947 in Japan but grew up in Mountain View, California. He received his B.A in Anthropology from Stanford University in 1970. He then received his masters in Philosophy and Indian Studies and his Ph.D. through the Graduate School of Humanities Doctoral Program in Buddhist Studies at the University of California, Berkeley. In 1991 Tanaka was appointed the Rev. Yoshitaka Tamai Professor at the Institute of Buddhist Studies, an affiliate of the Graduate Theological Union at Berkeley, California. He was president of the Buddhist Council of Northern California and served as editor of Pacific World: The Journal of the Institute of Buddhist Studies. In 1995 he became the pastor of the Southern Alameda County Buddhist Church.

Tanaka is the author of numerous articles and books on the subject of Buddhism. He was interviewed as part of the PBS report Tensions in American Buddhism in 2001 and Talk of the Nation program of National Public Radio. In 1998 he became professor of Buddhist Studies at Musashino University in Tokyo, Japan. He produced and appeared in a television series sponsored by the Bukkyo Dendo Kyokai foundation that aired in 2005, with DVDs later distributed. He gave the keynote address at the 750th memorial observance of Shinran in February 2010.

== Works ==
- The dawn of Chinese pure land Buddhist doctrine: Ching-ying Hui-yüan's Commentary on the Visualization sutra. State University of New York Press. 1990. ISBN 978-0-7914-0297-9. SUNY series in Buddhist studies
- with Charles S. Prebish, ed. (1998). The Faces of Buddhism in America. University of California Press. ISBN 978-0-520-21301-2.
- Ocean: An Introduction to Jodo-Shinshu Buddhism in America. WisdomOcean Publications. 1997. ISBN 978-0-9658062-0-6.
- with Eisho Nasu, ed. (1998). Engaged Pure Land Buddhism: The challenges of Jōdo-Shinshū in the contemporary world. WisdomOcean Publications. ISBN 978-0-9658062-1-3.
- Alfred Bloom, ed. (2004). Living in Amida's Universal Vow: essays in Shin Buddhism. World Wisdom. ISBN 978-0-941532-54-9. Preface: "Responsibility" and Chapter 17: "Ethics in American Jōdo-Shinshū: Trans Ethical Responsibility"
- with Richard Karl Payne, ed. (2004). Approaching the Land of Bliss: Religious Praxis in the Cult of Amitabha. University of Hawaii Press. ISBN 978-0-8248-2578-2. Volume 17 of Studies in East Asian Buddhism
- Pure land Buddhism: historical development and contemporary manifestation. Dharmaram Publications. 2004. ISBN 978-81-86861-72-1. Issue 8 of Faculty of philosophy, Dharma Endowment Lectures
- "Faith in Wŏnhyo's Commentary on the Sutra of the Buddha of Immeasurable Life: The Elevated Role of Faith over Contemplation and Its Implication for the Contribution of Korean Buddhism to the Development of Japanese Pure Land Buddhism" (PDF). Pacific World: Journal of the Institute of Buddhist Studies. Vol. Third Series, no. 6. Fall 2004. pp. 45–56.
- The Eastern Buddhist New Series Vol. XXXVII (The Eastern Buddhist Society, 2005)
- with Richard Karl Payne, ed. (January 30, 2008). Approaching the Land of Bliss: Religious Praxis in the Cult of Amitābha. Motilal Banarsidass. ISBN 978-81-208-3194-0. Volume 58 of Buddhist traditions
- Tanaka, Kenneth K. (2008). "Review of Asura's Harp: Engagement with Language as Buddhist Path by Dennis Hirota". Buddhist-Christian Studies. 28. University of Hawaii Press: 182–187. doi:10.1353/bcs.0.0020. ISSN 1527-9472. S2CID 170927203.
