= Muhammad Nari =

Coordinates: 34°14′4″N 71°50′20″E

- Town and union council
- Interactive map of Muhammad Nari
- Country: Pakistan
- Province: Khyber-Pakhtunkhwa
- District: Charsadda District
- Time zone: UTC+5 (PST)

Muhammad Nari is a town and union council in Charsadda District of Khyber-Pakhtunkhwa. It is located at 34°14'4N 71°50'20E and has an altitude of 318 metres (1046 feet).

It is the location of the discovery of an important piece of Gandharan Buddhist art, the Muhammad Nari Stele. It is among the finest examples of this variety of Stele, and is significant, as described by French historian Alfred Foucher for its purportedly novel showing of an iconic physical Buddha as compared to earlier aniconic depictions. This view has come into controversy in recent years, being described as potentially colonialist, ascribing the accomplishments of an Asian artistic tradition to Greek influence through Alexander the Great.
