= Chrysochroa elegans =

Scientific classification
- Kingdom: Animalia
- Phylum: Arthropoda
- Clade: Pancrustacea
- Class: Insecta
- Order: Coleoptera
- Suborder: Polyphaga
- Infraorder: Elateriformia
- Family: Buprestidae
- Genus: Chrysochroa
- Species: C. elegans

Binomial name
- Chrysochroa elegans Thunberg, 1784

Species of beetle

Chrysochroa elegans, the Japanese jewel beetle (tamamushi in Japanese), is a species of metallic wood-boring beetles (Buprestidae). It may be a synonym for Chrysochroa fulgidissima.
