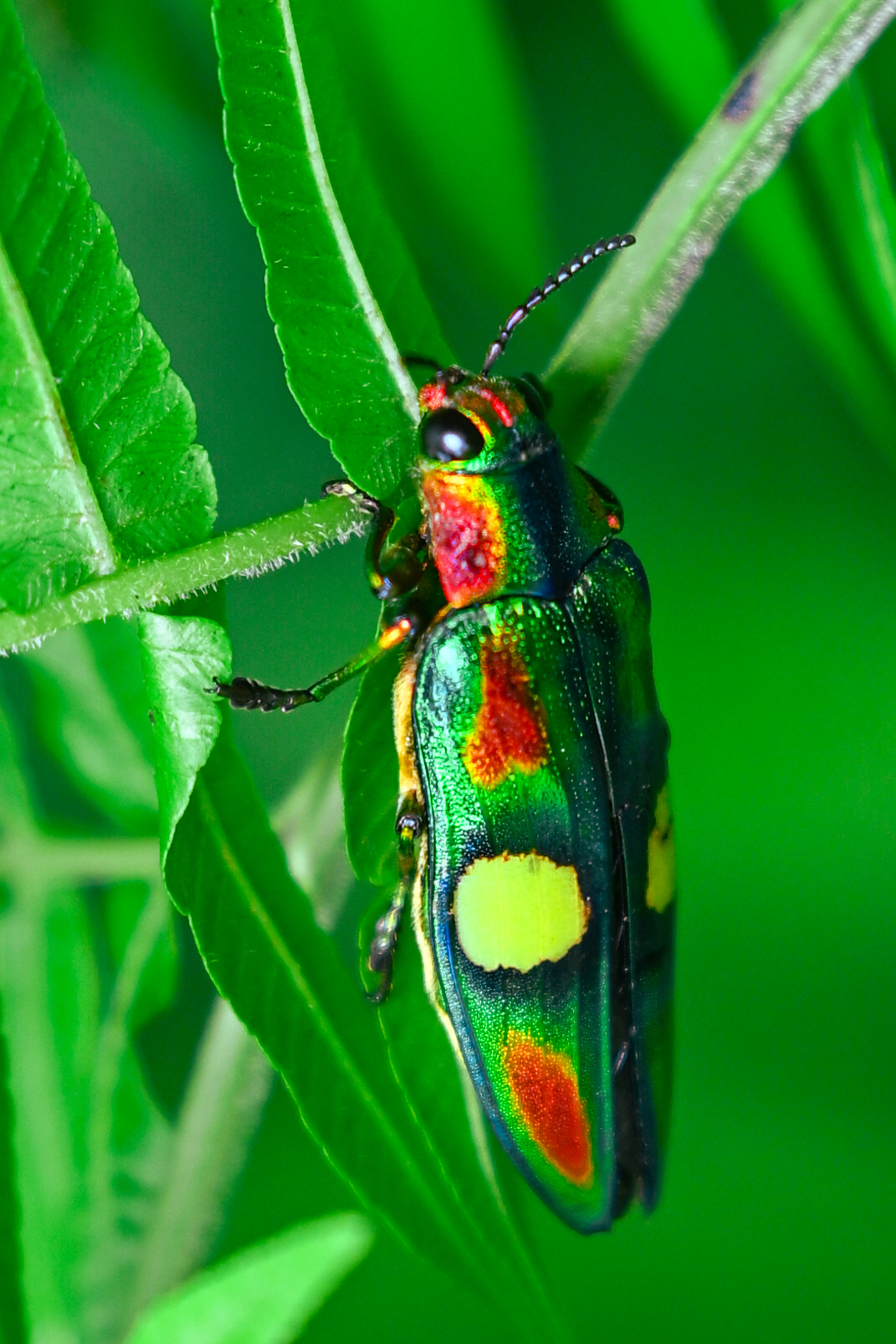
- A Chrysochroa toulgoeti from Dehing Patkai National Park, Assam

Scientific classification
- Kingdom: Animalia
- Phylum: Arthropoda
- Clade: Pancrustacea
- Class: Insecta
- Order: Coleoptera
- Suborder: Polyphaga
- Infraorder: Elateriformia
- Family: Buprestidae
- Genus: Chrysochroa
- Species: C. toulgoeti

Binomial name
- Chrysochroa toulgoeti Descarpentries, 1982

Synonyms
- Chrysochroa fulgens toulgoeti

= Chrysochroa toulgoeti =

Species of beetle

Chrysochroa toulgoeti is a metallic woodboring beetle of the family Buprestidae.

== Distribution ==
These beetles can be found in India and Malaysia.
