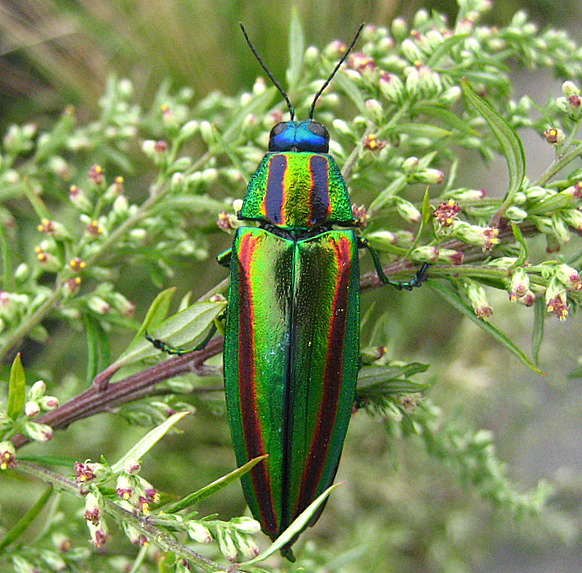
- "Tamamushi" (Chrysochroa fulgidissima) from Iizaka, Japan

Scientific classification
- Kingdom: Animalia
- Phylum: Arthropoda
- Clade: Pancrustacea
- Class: Insecta
- Order: Coleoptera
- Suborder: Polyphaga
- Infraorder: Elateriformia
- Family: Buprestidae
- Subfamily: Chrysochroinae
- Tribe: Chrysochroini
- Genus: Chrysochroa; Dejean, 1833

Synonyms
- Charytonia Gistel, 1848; Euchloris Billberg, 1820

= Chrysochroa =

Genus of beetles

Chrysochroa is a genus of "jewel" or metallic wood-boring beetles, typical of the tribe Chrysochroini. Most of the many species are native to Southeast Asian nations such as Malaysia, Indonesia, and the Philippines. However, a good number are found in India, one (Chrysochroa fulgidissima ssp. alternans) in Japan, (Chrysochroa coreana) in Korea, and one (Chrysochroa lepida) in Africa.

== Species ==
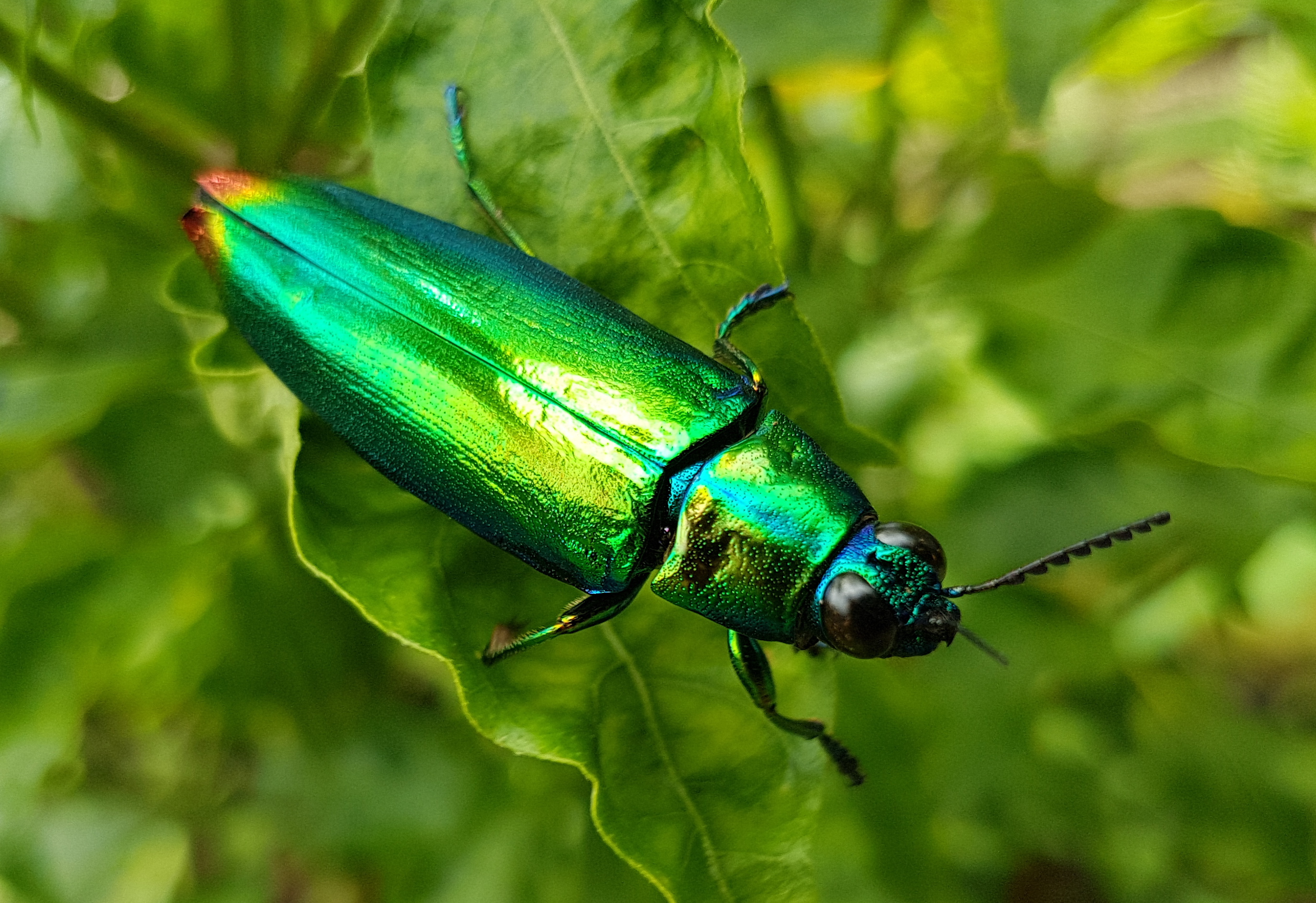
Chrysochroa fulminans from Mindanao, Philippines

- Chrysochroa akiyamai Lander, 1989
- Chrysochroa andamanensis Saunders, 1867
- Chrysochroa annamensis Bourgoin, 1924
- Chrysochroa aurotibialis Deyrolle, 1864
- Chrysochroa baudoni Descarpentries, 1963
- Chrysochroa blairi Lander, 1989
- Chrysochroa bloetei Théry, 1935
- Chrysochroa browni Saunders, 1872
- Chrysochroa buqueti (Gory, 1833)
- Chrysochroa caroli Perroud, 1853
- Chrysochroa castelnaudii Deyrolle, 1862
- Chrysochroa celebensis Obenberger, 1932
- Chrysochroa celebigena Obenberger, 1935
- Chrysochroa chongi Endo, 1992
- Chrysochroa coelicolor Obenberger, 1942
- Chrysochroa corbetti Kerremans, 1893
- Chrysochroa coreana Han et Park, 2012
- Chrysochroa cuprascens (Waterhouse, 1881)
- Chrysochroa edwardsii Hope, 1843
- Chrysochroa fallaciosa Théry, 1923
- Chrysochroa fulgens (DeGeer, 1778) (3 subspecies)
- Chrysochroa fulgidissima (Schönherr, 1817) (synonym Chrysochroa elegans Thunberg, 1784)
- Chrysochroa fulminans (Fabricius, 1787) - type species
- Chrysochroa gestroi Kurosawa, 1978
- Chrysochroa holstii Waterhouse in Waterhouse & Gahan, 1890
- Chrysochroa ignita (Linnaeus, 1758)
- Chrysochroa intermedia Lander, 1992
- Chrysochroa ixora Gory, 1840
- Chrysochroa jasienskii Hołyński, 2009
- Chrysochroa klapaleki Obenberger, 1924
- Chrysochroa landeri Hołyński, 2009
- Chrysochroa limbata Nonfried, 1891
- Chrysochroa ludekingii Snellen von Vollenhoeven, 1864
- Chrysochroa mirabilis Thomson, 1878
- Chrysochroa miribella Obenberger, 1939
- Chrysochroa mniszechii Deyrolle, 1861
- Chrysochroa ocellata (Fabricius, 1775)
- Chrysochroa parryi Saunders, 1867
- Chrysochroa perrotetii Guérin-Méneville, 1840
- Chrysochroa pseudoludekingii Lander, 1992
- Chrysochroa purpureiventris Deyrolle, 1864
- Chrysochroa rajah Gory, 1840
- Chrysochroa rogeri Dupont, 1832
- Chrysochroa rugicollis Saunders, 1866
- Chrysochroa sakaii Ohmomo, 1999
- Chrysochroa sarasinorum Flach, 1887
- Chrysochroa saundersii Saunders, 1866
- Chrysochroa semperi Saunders, 1874
- Chrysochroa similis Saunders, 1867
- Chrysochroa toulgoeti Descarpentries, 1982
- Chrysochroa unidentata (Fabricius, 1775)
- Chrysochroa viridisplendens Théry, 1898
- Chrysochroa vittata (Fabricius, 1775)
- Chrysochroa wallacei Deyrolle, 1864
- Chrysochroa waterstradti Théry, 1923
- Chrysochroa weyersii Deyrolle, 1864
