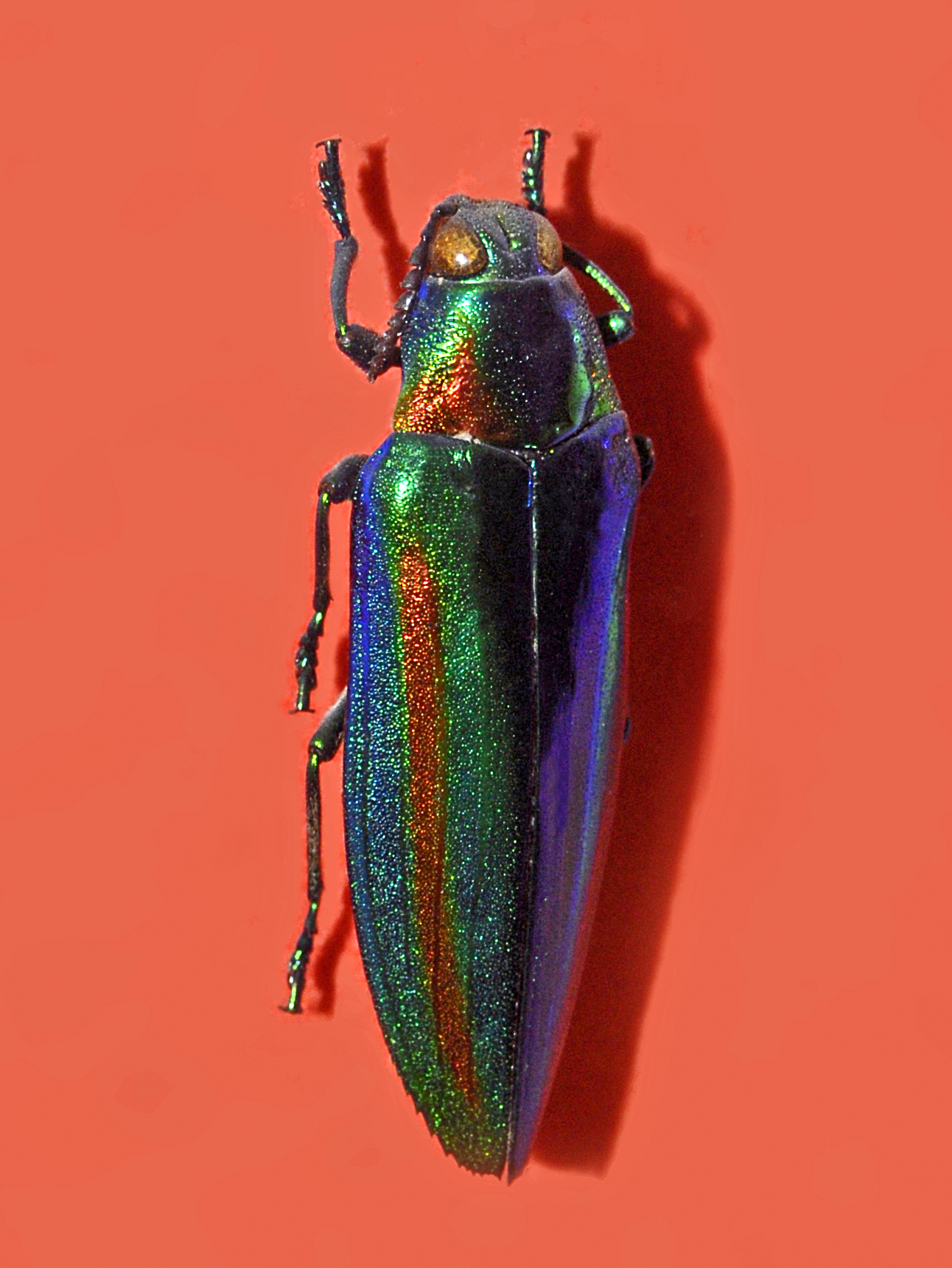
- Museum specimen of Chrysochroa vittata

Scientific classification
- Domain: Eukaryota
- Kingdom: Animalia
- Phylum: Arthropoda
- Class: Insecta
- Order: Coleoptera
- Suborder: Polyphaga
- Infraorder: Elateriformia
- Family: Buprestidae
- Genus: Chrysochroa
- Species: C. vittata

Binomial name
- Chrysochroa vittata (Fabricius, 1775)

= Chrysochroa vittata =

Species of beetle

Chrysochroa vittata is a species of beetle in the family Buprestidae.

== Description ==
Chrysochroa vittata can reach a length of about 35–43 millimetres (1.4–1.7 in). Elytra normally are metallic green, with metallic red and blue longitudinal stripes. The legs are bright green. These wood-boring beetles show a striking example of the colour-changing feature called iridescence. Their metallic colours derive from structural colours created by multilayers in the cuticle. The insect may appear red, greenish or completely green depending on the light incidence.

== Distribution ==
This species can be found from India to China and Thailand.
