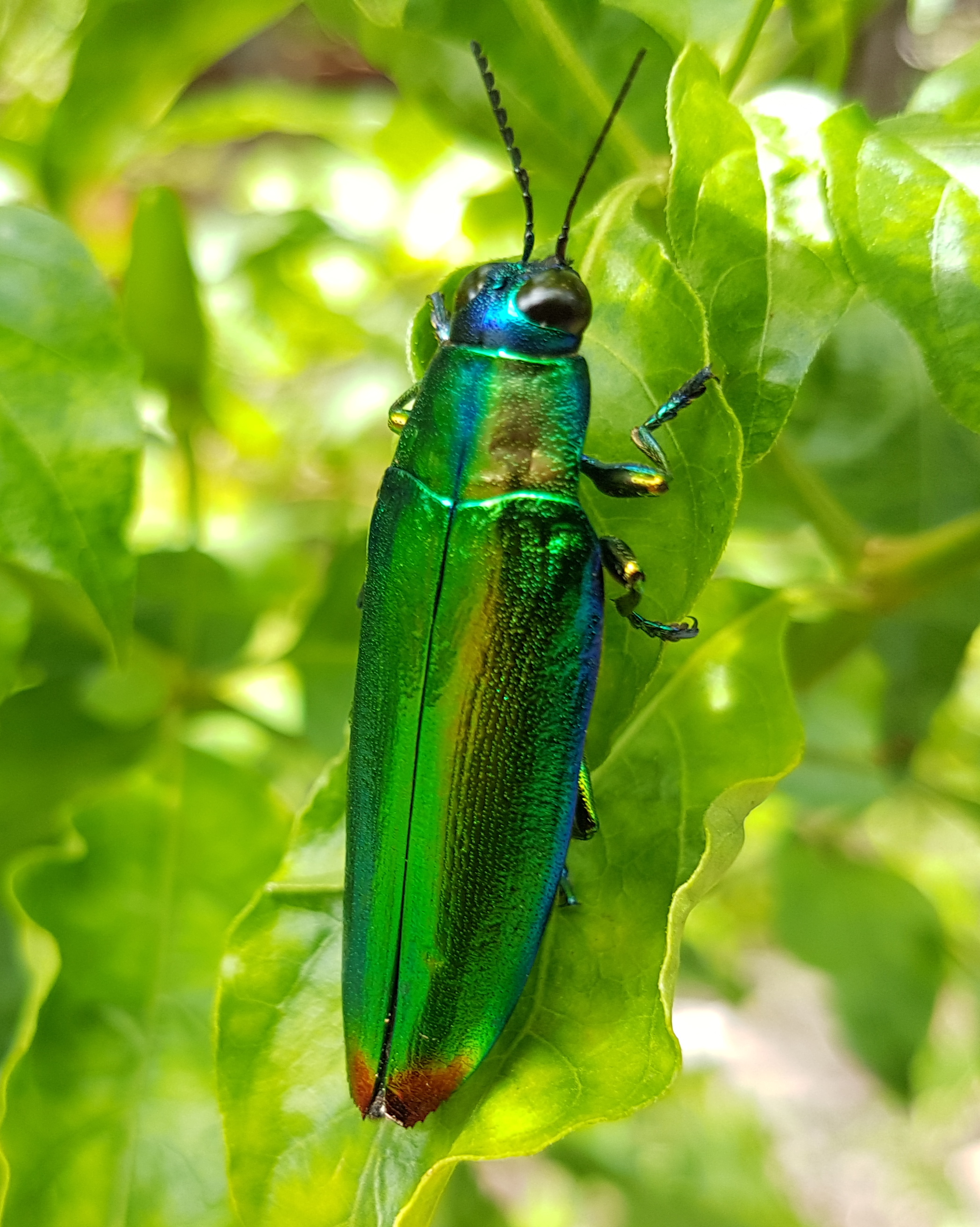
- Chrysochroa fulminans from Mindanao
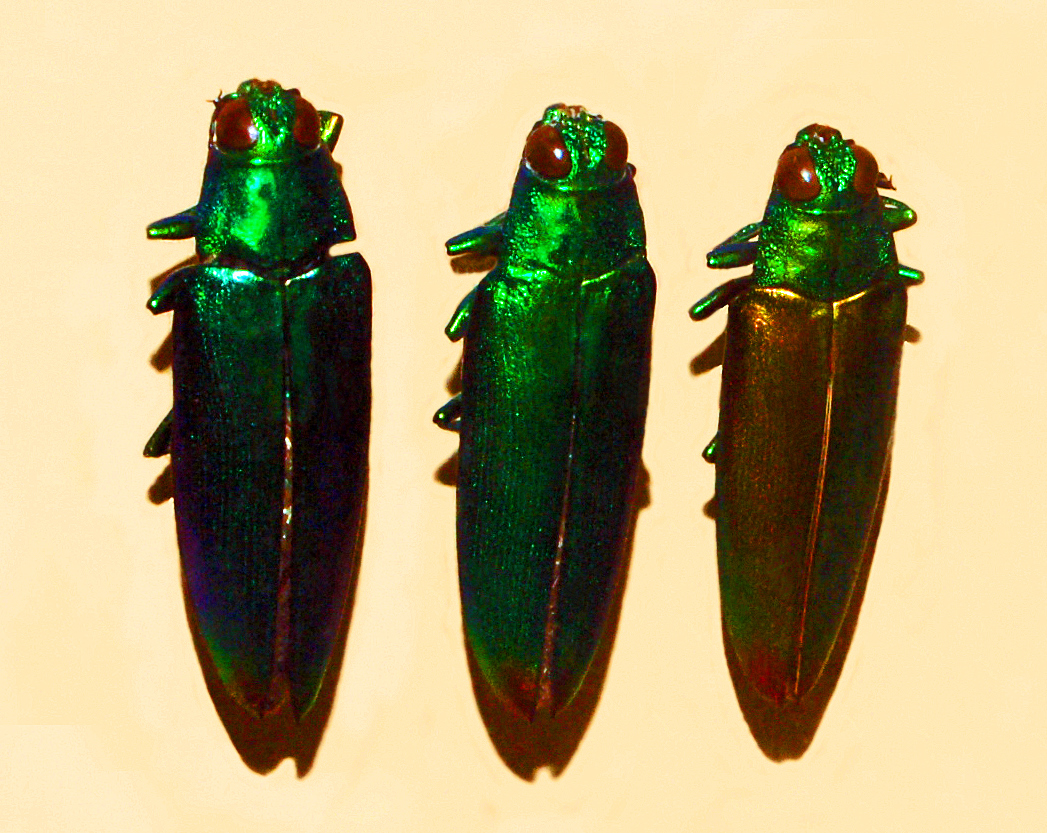
- Chrysochroa fulminans from Sumatra

Scientific classification
- Kingdom: Animalia
- Phylum: Arthropoda
- Clade: Pancrustacea
- Class: Insecta
- Order: Coleoptera
- Suborder: Polyphaga
- Infraorder: Elateriformia
- Family: Buprestidae
- Subfamily: Chrysochroinae
- Tribe: Chrysochroini
- Genus: Chrysochroa
- Species: C. fulminans

Binomial name
- Chrysochroa fulminans (Fabricius, 1787)

Synonyms
- Buprestis fulgurans Illiger, 1800; Buprestis fulminans Fabricius, 1787; Chrysochroa ceilonensis (Voet, 1804); Chrysochroa cobaltina Fisher, 1922; Chrysochroa coerula Kerremans, 1903; Chrysochroa crassicollis Théry, 1930; Chrysochroa diana Kerremans, 1914; Chrysochroa eschscholtzii Thomson, 1878; Chrysochroa fulgurans (Illiger, 1800); Chrysochroa lata Schaufuss, 1885; Chrysochroa leopoldi Théry, 1933; Chrysochroa mikado Obenberger, 1919; Chrysochroa nigra Veth, 1913; Chrysochroa rouyeri Théry, 1933; Chrysochroa strandi Obenberger, 1928; Chrysochroa vanrooni Obenberger, 1928; Cucujus ceilonensis Voet, 1804

= Chrysochroa fulminans =

Species of beetle

Chrysochroa fulminans is the type species of jewel beetle in its genus; it belongs to the family Buprestidae, tribe Chrysochroini and subgenus Chrysochroa.

== Description ==
Chrysochroa fulminans can reach a length of about 30–40 millimetres (1.2–1.6 in). These beetles have a glossy surface with iridescent colors varying from green to reddish or violet.

== List of subspecies ==
- Chrysochroa fulminans agusanensis Kurosawa, 1979
- Chrysochroa fulminans aurora Heller, 1912
- Chrysochroa fulminans babuyanensis Kurosawa, 1989
- Chrysochroa fulminans baliana Obenberger, 1928
- Chrysochroa fulminans bimanensis Lansberge, 1879
- Chrysochroa fulminans chrysura Gory, 1840
- Chrysochroa fulminans chrysuroides Deyrolle, 1864
- Chrysochroa fulminans cyaneonigra Kurosawa, 1991
- Chrysochroa fulminans florensis Kerremans, 1891
- Chrysochroa fulminans fulminans (Fabricius, 1787)
- Chrysochroa fulminans funebris Théry, 1898
- Chrysochroa fulminans kaupii Deyrolle, 1864
- Chrysochroa fulminans krausei Descarpentries, 1971
- Chrysochroa fulminans nagaii Kurosawa, 1990
- Chrysochroa fulminans nishiyamai Kurosawa, 1990
- Chrysochroa fulminans nylanderiHołyński, 2009
- Chrysochroa fulminans praelonga White, 1843
- Chrysochroa fulminans variabilis Deyrolle, 1864
- Chrysochroa fulminans vethiana Obenberger, 1926

== Distribution ==
These beetles can be found from Malaysia, Indonesia, the Philippines, to Papua New Guinea.
