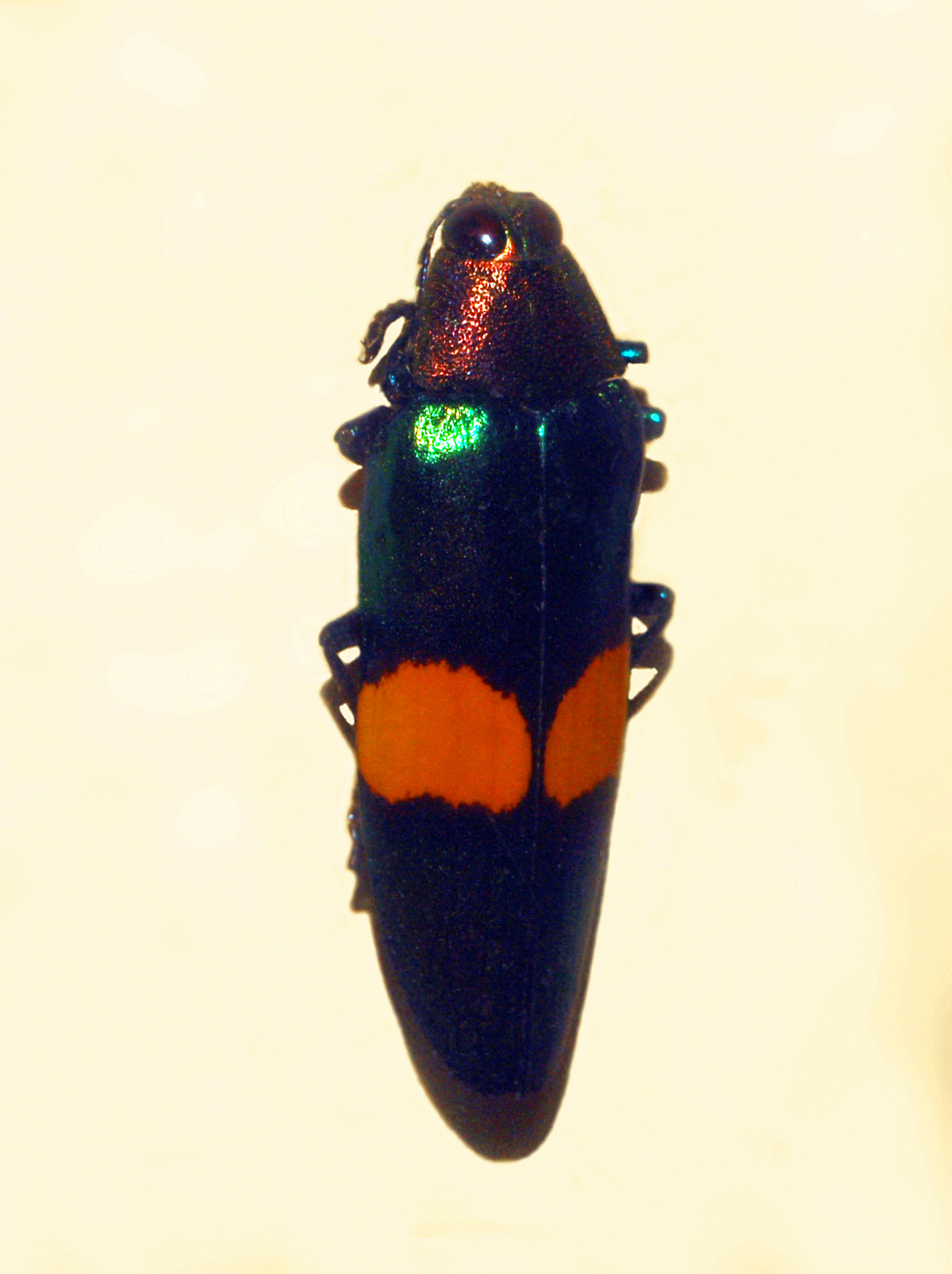
- Chrysochroa edwardsii from India

Scientific classification
- Kingdom: Animalia
- Phylum: Arthropoda
- Clade: Pancrustacea
- Class: Insecta
- Order: Coleoptera
- Suborder: Polyphaga
- Infraorder: Elateriformia
- Family: Buprestidae
- Genus: Chrysochroa
- Species: C. edwardsii

Binomial name
- Chrysochroa edwardsii Hope, 1843

= Chrysochroa edwardsii =

Species of beetle

Chrysochroa edwardsii is a beetle of the Buprestidae family.

== Description ==
Chrysochroa edwardsii can reach a length of about 40 millimetres (1.6 in). Elytra are metallic green, with a large and rounded yellow-orange transversal band. Pronotum can be greenish with a strong metallic red tint or dark purple and the legs are bright green. Only the yellow-orange band shows a medium to high reflectance in the near-infrared part of the spectrum.

== Distribution ==
These beetles can be found in India and Thailand.
