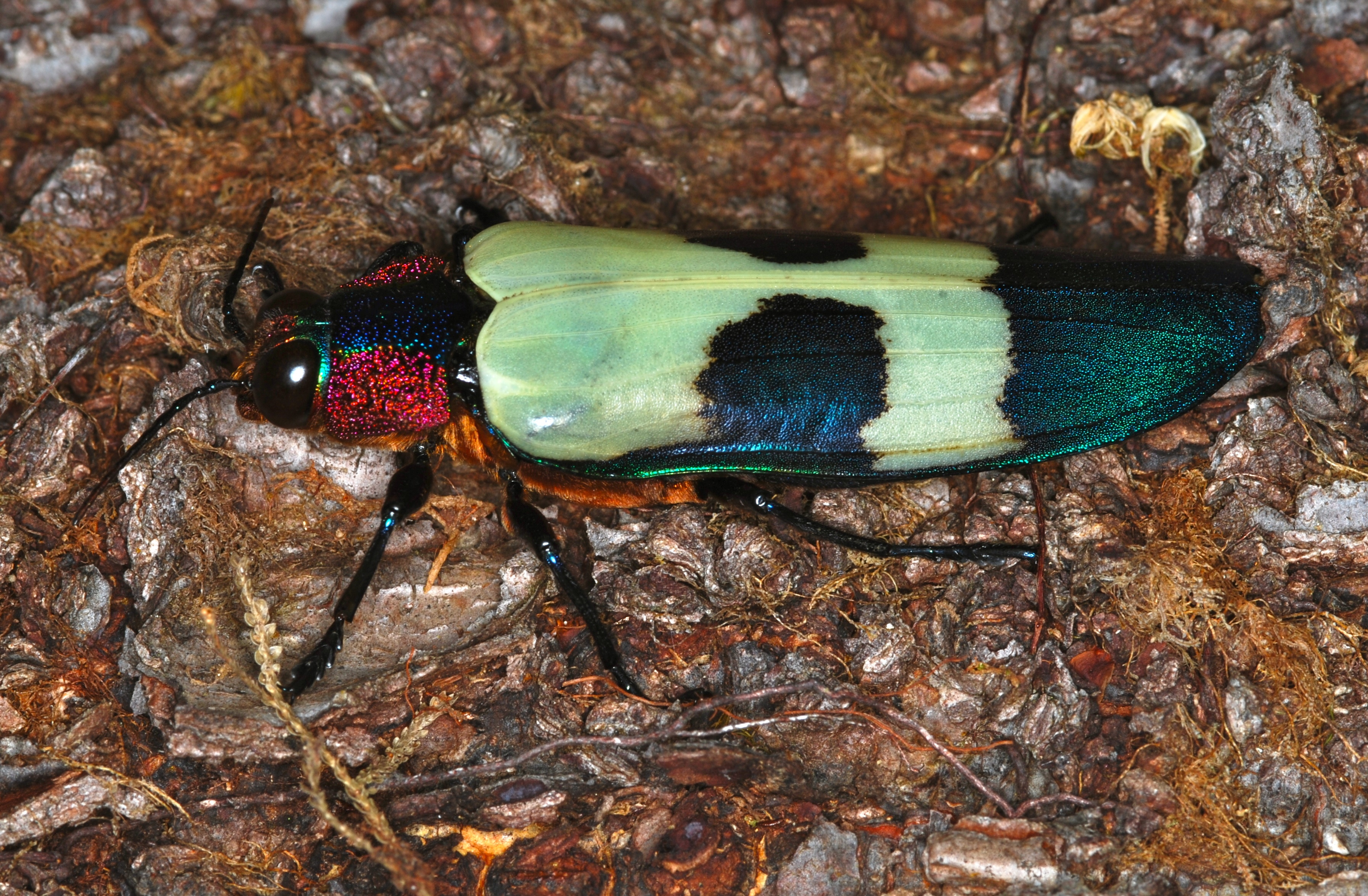
- Chrysochroa buqueti

Scientific classification
- Kingdom: Animalia
- Phylum: Arthropoda
- Clade: Pancrustacea
- Class: Insecta
- Order: Coleoptera
- Suborder: Polyphaga
- Infraorder: Elateriformia
- Family: Buprestidae
- Subfamily: Chrysochroinae
- Tribe: Chrysochroini
- Genus: Chrysochroa
- Species: C. buqueti

Binomial name
- Chrysochroa buqueti (Gory, 1833)
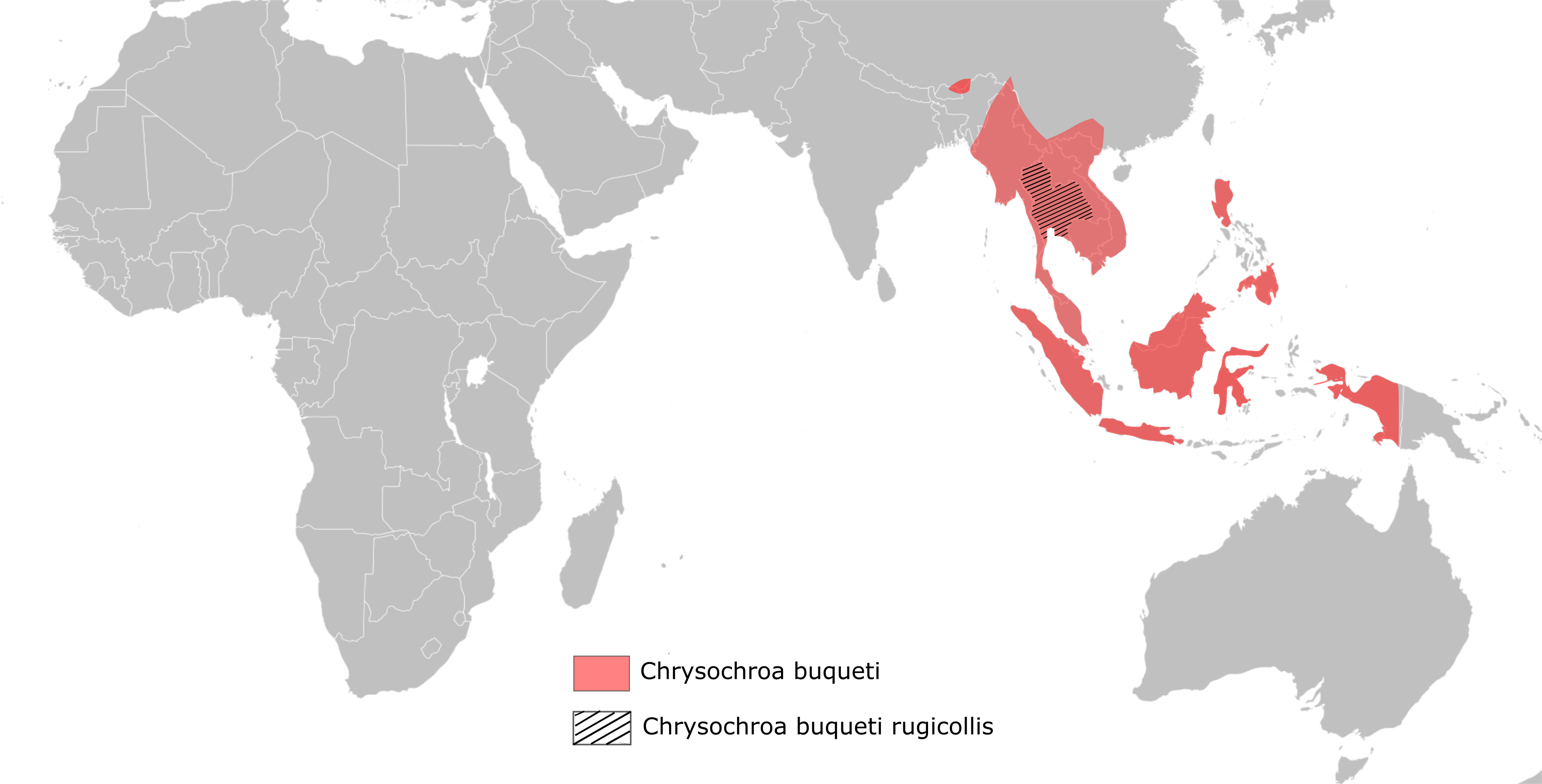
- SE Asian range

= Chrysochroa buqueti =

Species of beetle

Chrysochroa buqueti, the red speckled jewel beetle, is a Southeast Asian species of beetle in the Buprestidae family and tribe Chrysochroini. It is found in the Indomalayan realm (especially Indochina, Borneo and Malaysia).

== Description ==
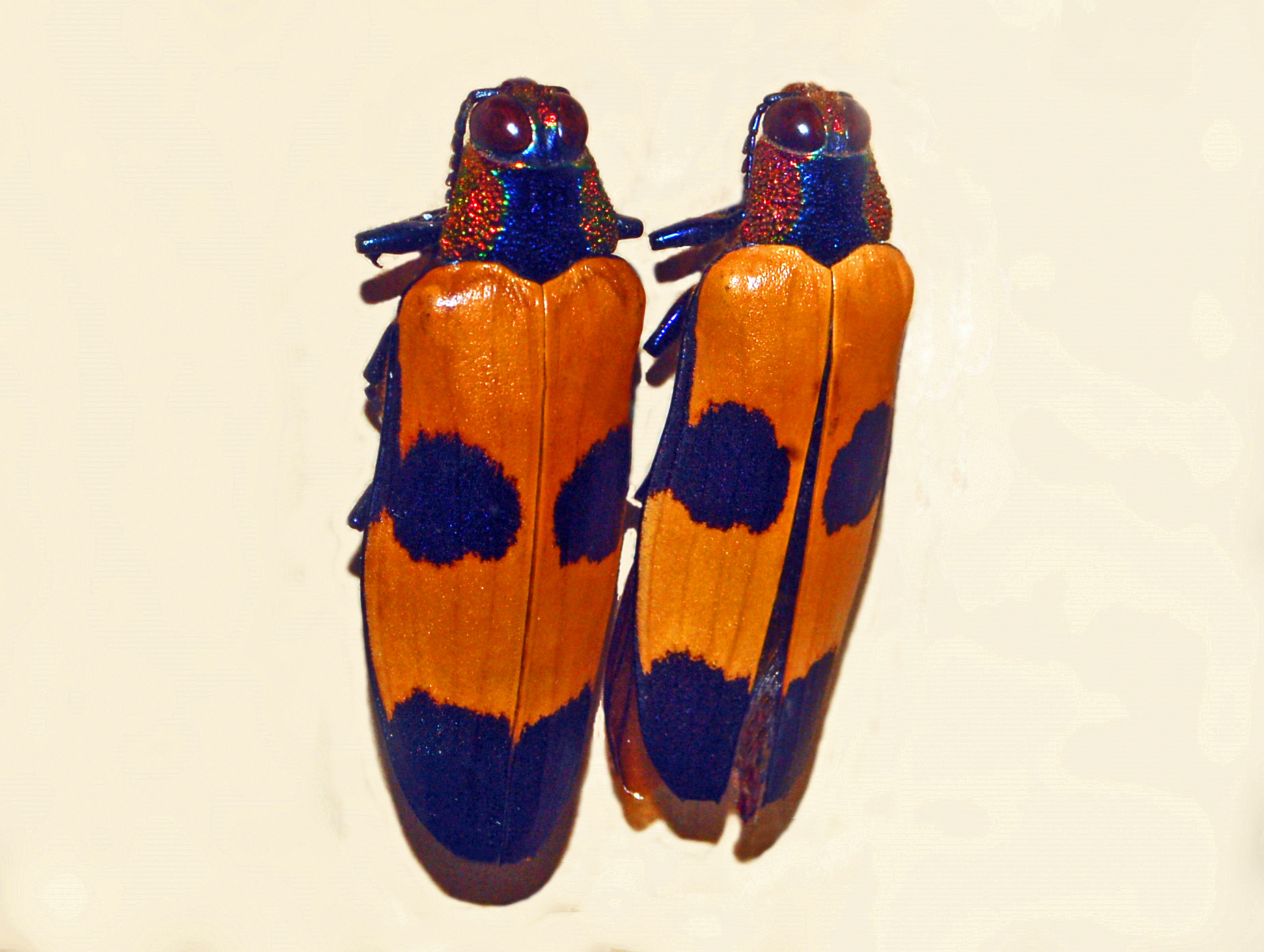
museum specimens from Java

Chrysochroa buqueti can reach a length of about 40–47 millimetres (1.6–1.9 in). Elytra may be green to orange-yellow, with bluish-black markings, while pronotum is metallic red or metallic blue with metallic red areas on the sides. The legs are bright bluish-black. Black markings on the elytra typically also show no reflectance in the near-infrared part of the spectrum.
