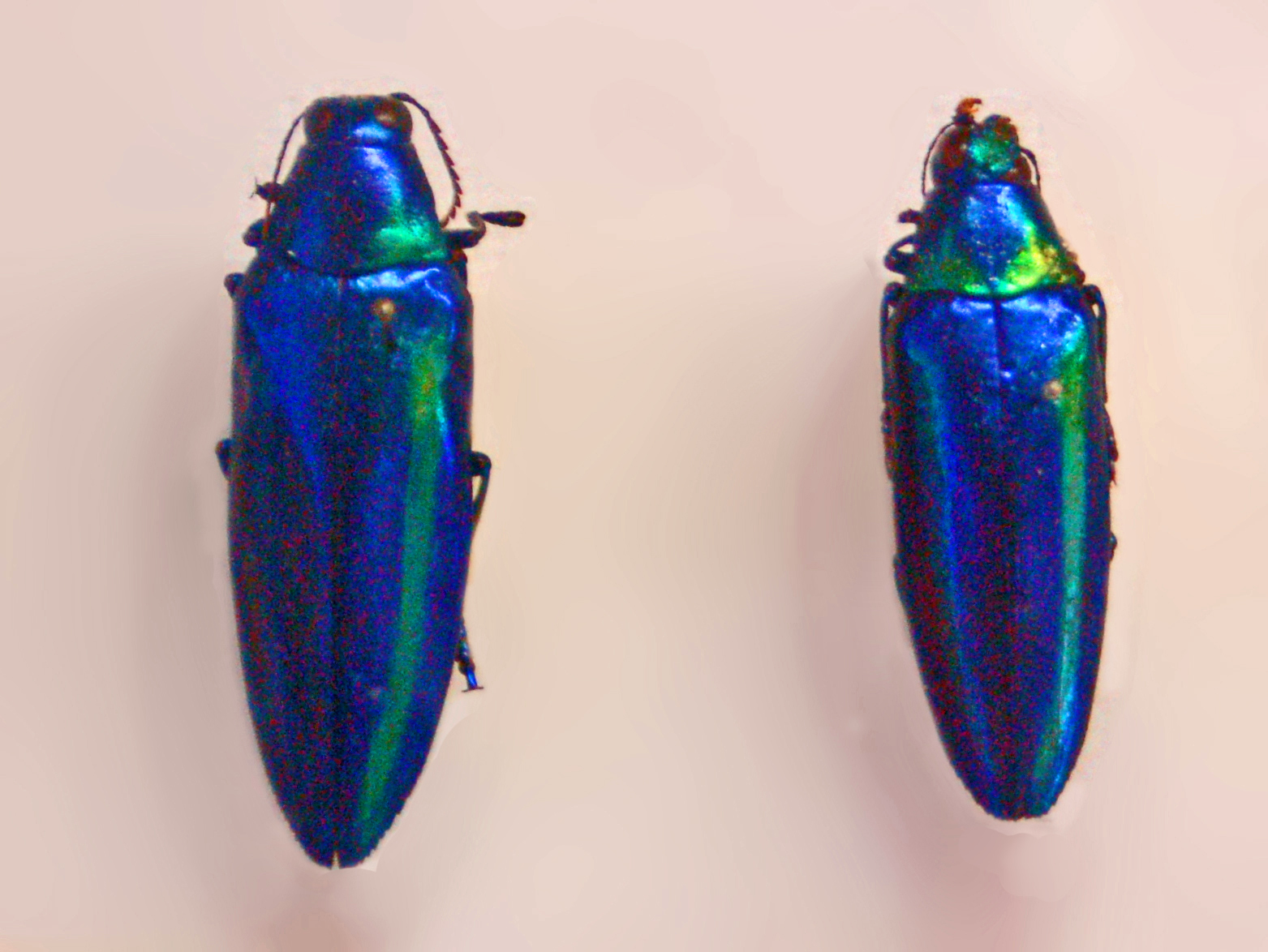
- Chrysochroa rajah from southern China, mounted specimen at National Museum (Prague)

Scientific classification
- Kingdom: Animalia
- Phylum: Arthropoda
- Clade: Pancrustacea
- Class: Insecta
- Order: Coleoptera
- Suborder: Polyphaga
- Infraorder: Elateriformia
- Family: Buprestidae
- Genus: Chrysochroa
- Species: C. rajah

Binomial name
- Chrysochroa rajah Gory, 1840

Synonyms
- Chrysochroa chinensis Laporte & Gory, 1835

= Chrysochroa rajah =

Species of beetle

Chrysochroa rajah is a species of beetle in the family Buprestidae.

== Description ==
Chrysochroa rajah can reach a length of about 32–48 millimetres (1.3–1.9 in). These beetles have a glossy surface with beautiful iridescent colors varying from blue to green, sometimes with red longitudinal stripes or spots.

== Distribution ==
These beetles can be found from India and China up to Thailand and Laos.

== Subspecies ==
- Chrysochroa rajah assamensis Guérin-Méneville, 1847 (China)
- Chrysochroa rajah nilgiriensis Kurosawa, 1978 (India)
- Chrysochroa rajah rajah Gory, 1840
- Chrysochroa rajah thailandica Kurosawa, 1978 (Thailand, Laos)
- Chrysochroa rajah unnoi Kurosawa, 1978

== Gallery ==
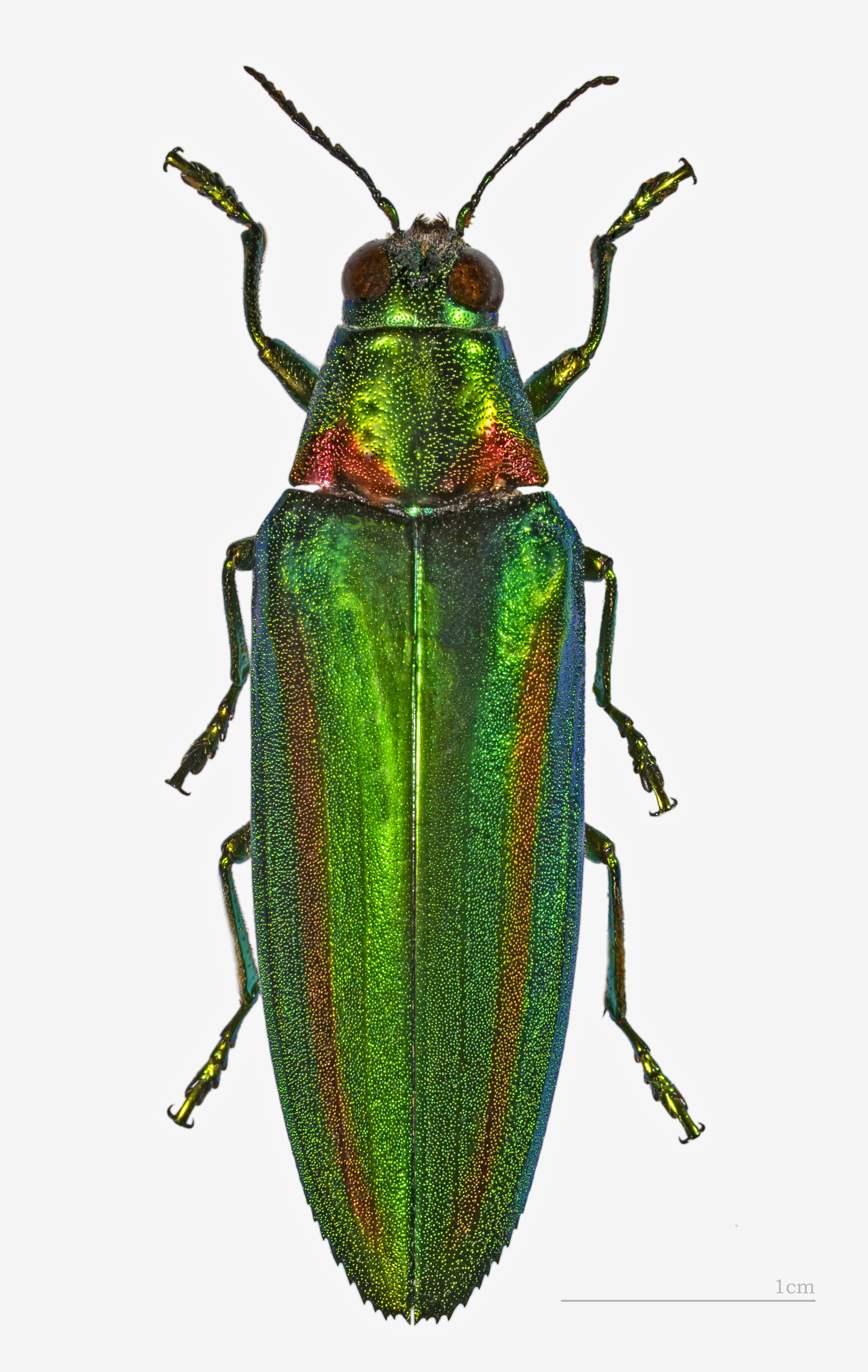
Chrysochroa rajah thailandica at the Muséum de Toulouse

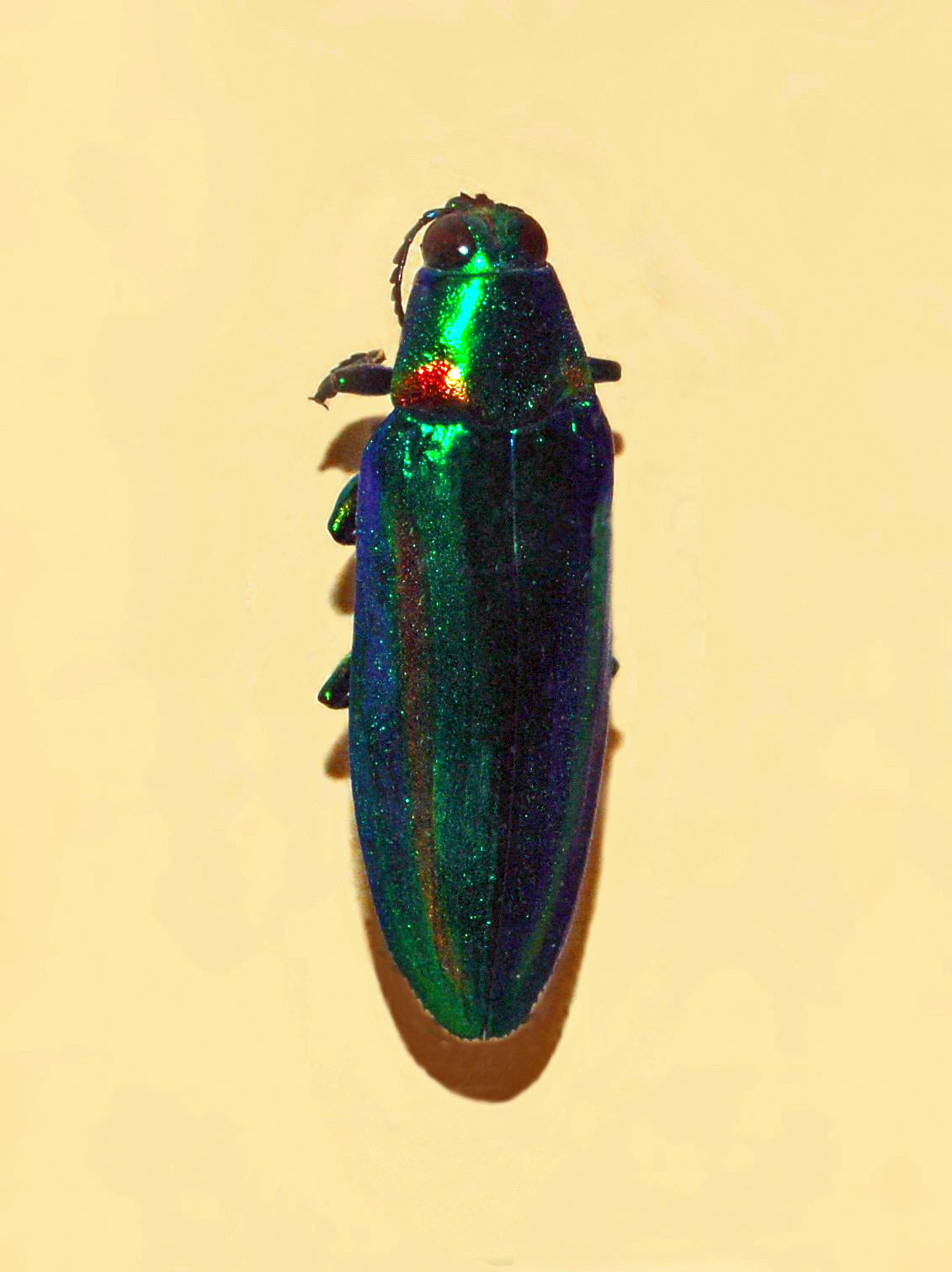
Chrysochroa rajah from Myanmar
