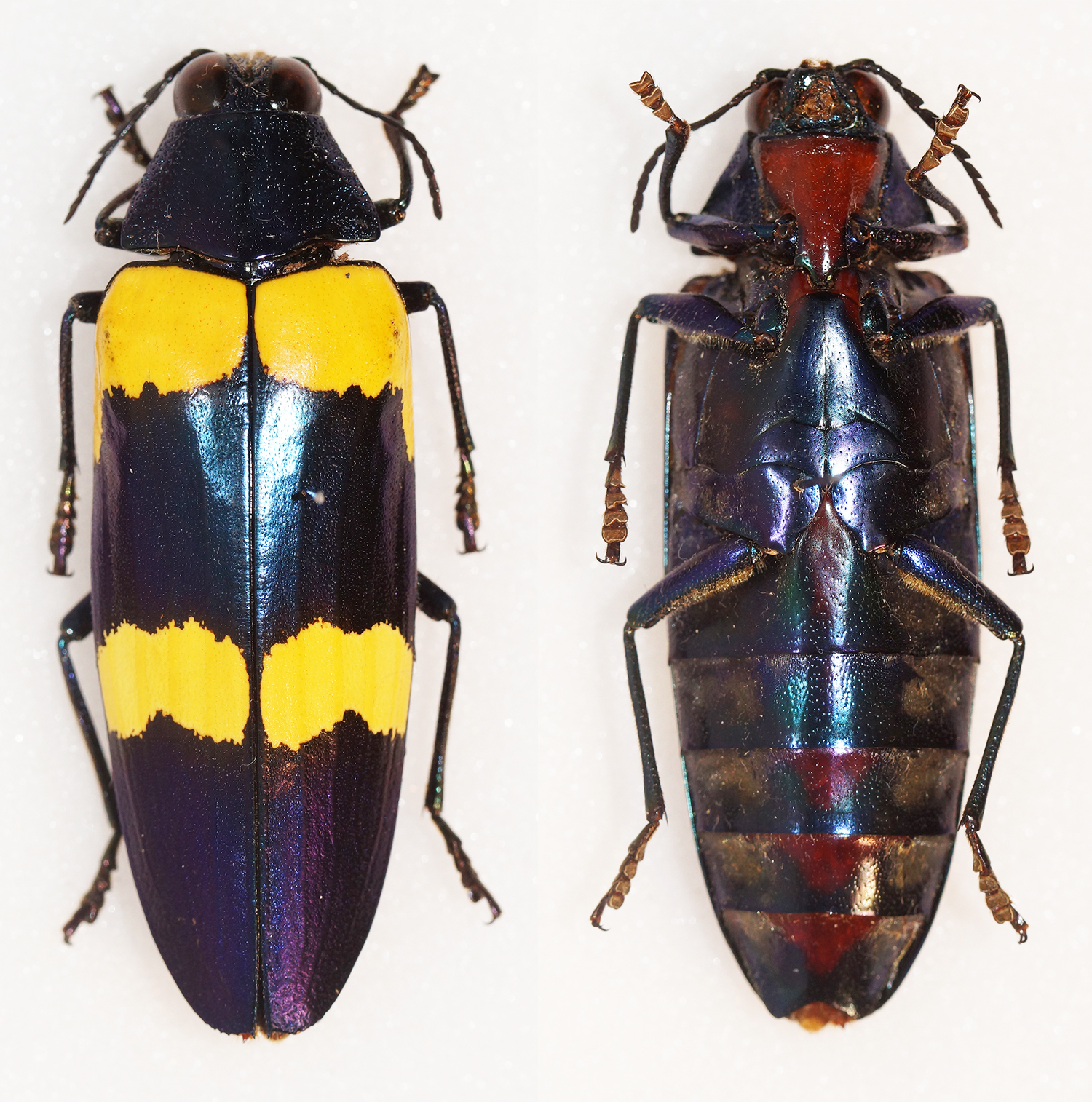

Scientific classification
- Kingdom: Animalia
- Phylum: Arthropoda
- Class: Insecta
- Order: Coleoptera
- Suborder: Polyphaga
- Infraorder: Elateriformia
- Family: Buprestidae
- Genus: Chrysochroa
- Species: C. mniszechii

Binomial name
- Chrysochroa mniszechii Deyrolle, 1861

= Chrysochroa mniszechii =

Species of beetle

Chrysochroa mniszechii is a species of beetle in the Buprestidae family, that can be found in Asia in countries such as Thailand and China.
