= Tachibana Shrine =

Japanese 8th-century Buddhist shrine in Nara Prefecture, Japan

Coordinates: 34°36′54.2″N 135°44′7.1″E

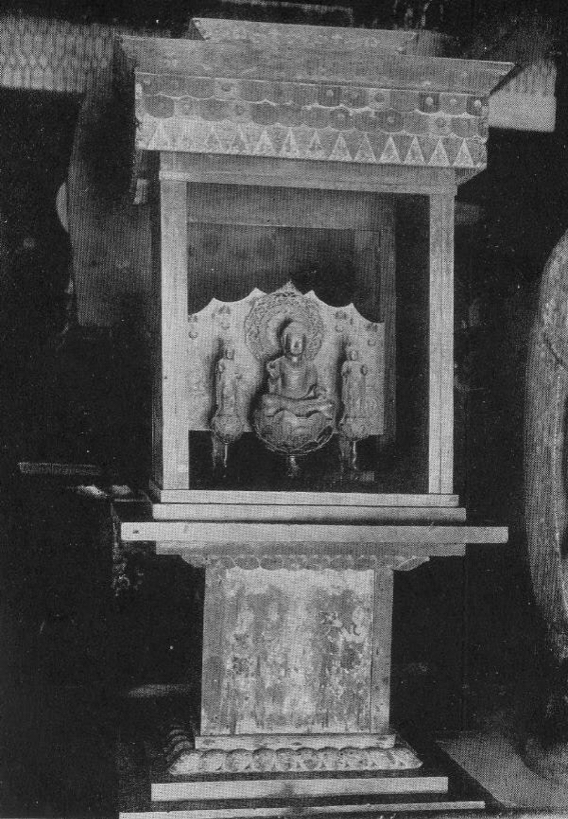
The Lady Tachibana Shrine at Hōryū-ji; height of shrine 263 centimetres (8 ft 8 in); height of Amida Nyorai 34.0 centimetres (13.4 in), of Kannon (right) 28.9 centimetres (11.4 in), of Seishi (left) 28.8 centimetres (11.3 in) (National Treasure)

The Tachibana Shrine (橘夫人厨子, Tachibana-fujin no zushi), also referred to as the Lady Tachibana Shrine, is a miniature shrine owned by the Hōryū-ji temple complex of Nara Prefecture, Japan. Its precise date of construction is unknown, but it is thought to have been created a little later than its counterpart the Tamamushi Shrine. The sculptures inside are dated to the years around 710 (the end of the Asuka period and start of the Nara period) and have been designated a National Treasure.

== History ==
The precise date of the shrine is uncertain, but it is generally placed at the end of the Asuka period (710). A terminus ante quem is provided by the first documentary evidence for its existence, mention in the temple inventory of 747, the Hōryū-ji garan engi narabini ruki shizai-chō (法隆寺伽藍縁起并流記資材帳), which includes "two items taking the form of a palace building, one with a design of a Thousand Buddhas in repoussé metalwork, the other with a statue of gilt bronze" (宮殿像貳具 一具金泥押出千佛像 一具金泥銅像); the former is understood to be the Tamamushi Shrine, the latter the Tachibana Shrine. A fuller description is given by the monk Kenshin (顕真) in his Shōtoku Taishi-den shiki (聖徳太子伝私記), also referred to as the Kokon mokuroku shō (古今目録抄), his 1230s account of Shōtoku Taishi, prince, regent, culture hero closely associated with the early promotion of Buddhism in Japan, and founder of the temple. Kenshin refers to the shrine's black lacquered pedestal, floor of gilt bronze waves, with lotuses rising up from it, and to the three sculptures placed upon them; attributes its commissioning to Lady Tachibana, the mother of Empress Kōmyō (the shrine may have been bestowed upon Hōryū-ji by Kōmyō on her mother's death in 733); and locates it to the west of the Tamamushi Shrine. The Kondō nikki (金堂日記) similarly refers to a west shrine with an Amida Triad - and it is understood that the two shrines were located on the great altar of the Kondō for many centuries, until their modern relocation to the Gallery of Temple Treasures.

== Description ==
The wooden shrine is generously proportioned for the three images it houses. The top is decorated in the form of a canopy with two rows of overlapping cloth hangings and a row of triangles, in blue, three different reds, yellow, and black, on a white ground. When first constructed, the shrine may have been open on all four sides, the roof supported on columns, making its doors a somewhat later addition. Of the three pairs of doors, at the front and either side, the two at the front are more recent, one of the originals being in the Fujita Collection. They are painted on both sides with Niō and Shitennō guardians and boddhisattvas, in gold paste on a lacquer ground. The pedestal, with carved lotus petals at top and bottom, is painted with a pair of standing boddhisattvas with raised hands on the front, arhats on the narrower sides, and on the better-preserved back, a scene with three figures in different poses on lotuses, on a white gofun ground, produced from heated shells. As well as that of the Tang, strong Indian influence has been identified in these paintings, with Soper and Paine remarking that "the shrine reveals the many influences which were then current in Buddhism, as it reached Japan at the turn of the seventh century".

On the floor of the interior is a bronze plaque with a depiction in relief of a lotus pond, with ripples and lotus leaves. It is punctured with three holes from which rise three lotus stalks, upon which are seated the so-called Lady Tachibana nenjibutsu (tutelary image for daily personal worship), a gilt bronze triad of Amida flanked by Kannon (on the worshipper/viewer's right) and Seishi. Behind, with two slots in the base plaque, is a tripartite hinged screen with five boddhisattvas and heavenly maidens in relief, and an openwork halo for the central image. As Kidder has observed, the size of the two flanking figures makes them "little different" from the single images produced for aristocratic families, of which there are many examples amongst the Treasures from Hōryū-ji at Tokyo National Museum, while as an ensemble this is the most ambitious overall programme in bronze to survive. Marking the pinnacle of contemporary bronze casting and carving also from technological perspective, the statues have been designated a National Treasure.

== Significance ==
Thanks to its connection with Lady Tachibana, the shrine stands alongside the Taima mandala as testimony to eighth-century female interest in Amidism.

== See also ==
- National Treasures of Japan (Sculptures)
- Buddhist Monuments in the Hōryū-ji Area
- List of Hōryū-ji Treasures at Tokyo National Museum
- Tamamushi Shrine
- Shōsōin
