= André Descarpentries =

French entomologist (1919–1998)

- Born: 18 November 1919; Paris
- Died: 25 May 1998; Paris
- Citizenship: France
- Known for: Study of beetles
- Scientific career
- Fields: Entomology
- Workplaces: National Museum of Natural History
- Author abbrev. (zoology): Descarpentries

André Descarpentries (18 November 1919 –25 May 1998) was a French entomologist. He specialised in the study of beetles.

== Work ==
As a fellow of National Museum of Natural History, Paris he was one of the exparts on the family Buprestidae. He Published a well number of research papers and discovered, described and classified hundreds of Jewel beetle species. In his honour, several grop of fellow scientists named several newly discovered species after him.
