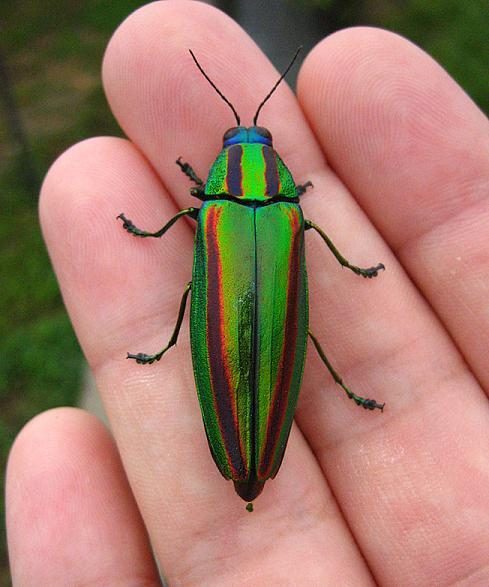
- A "tamamushi" beetle in Iizaka, Japan.

Scientific classification
- Kingdom: Animalia
- Phylum: Arthropoda
- Clade: Pancrustacea
- Class: Insecta
- Order: Coleoptera
- Suborder: Polyphaga
- Infraorder: Elateriformia
- Family: Buprestidae
- Genus: Chrysochroa
- Species: C. fulgidissima

Binomial name
- Chrysochroa fulgidissima Schönherr, 1817
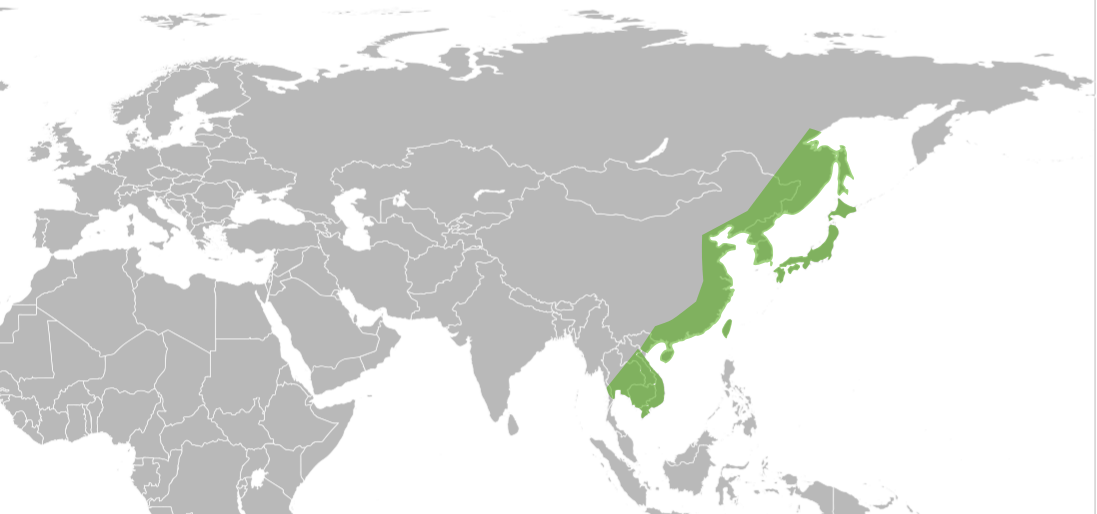

= Chrysochroa fulgidissima =

Species of beetle

Chrysochroa fulgidissima, "jewel beetle" or Yamato tamamushi in Japanese (ヤマトタマムシ) is a metallic woodboring beetle of the family Buprestidae.

== Characteristics ==
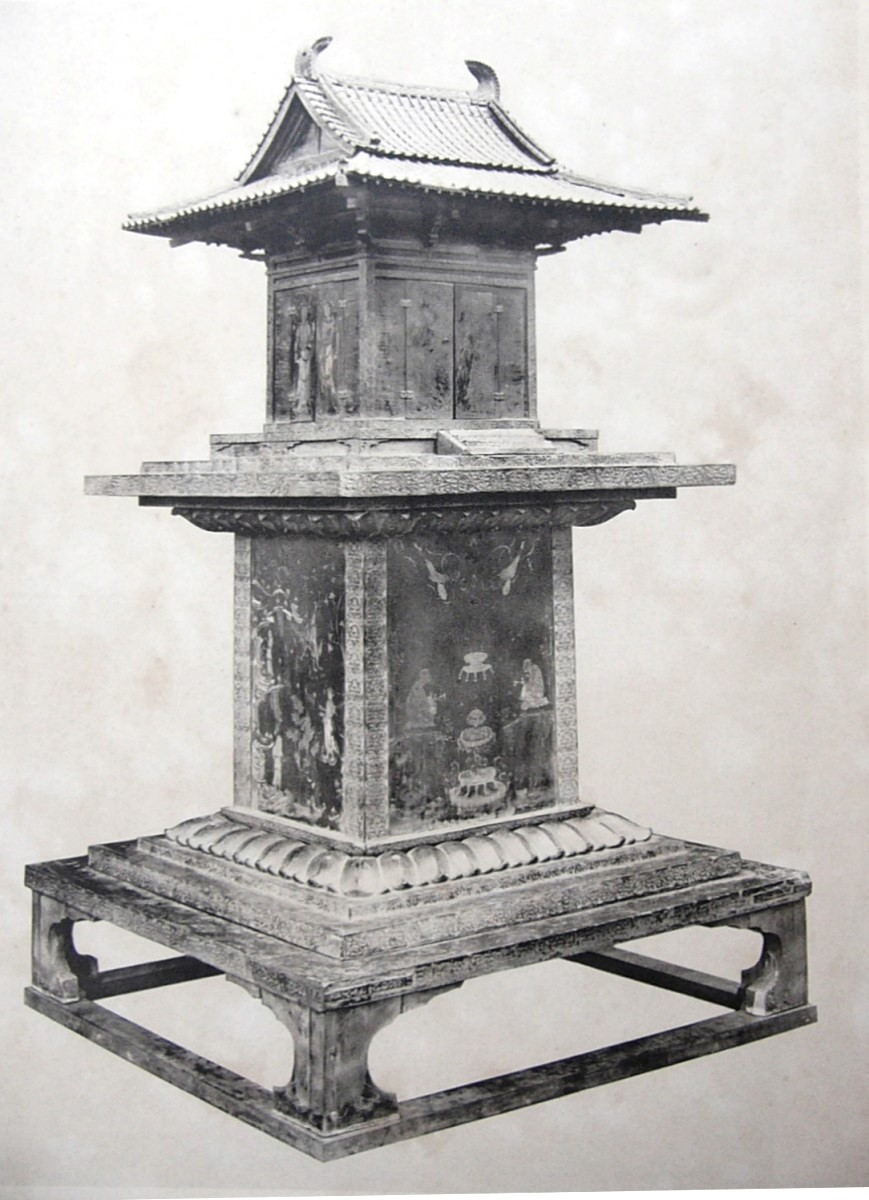
Tamamushi Shrine at Hōryū-ji. Its decoration included jewel beetle (Tamamushi) wings.

This beetle is native to Japan and Korea. It is typically found in woods or forests during summer under the strong sunshine and can grow between 30–41 millimetres (1.2–1.6 in) in length.

The Tamamushi Shrine, an Asuka Period miniature shrine located at Hōryū-ji Temple, Nara prefecture, was decorated with lacquer and oil painting on wood, gilt bronze plaques, and with beetlewing work using the iridescent wings of the Chrysochroa fulgidissima beetle.

=== Tamamushi-iro ===
Since this insect has iridescent wings that glow lengthwise with different colors depending upon the light angle, one cannot be sure exactly which color it is. Therefore, it gave rise to the expression tamamushi-iro (tamamushi color), in reference to a convoluted statement that can be interpreted in more ways than one.

The term tamamushi-iro is used in the context of Japanese officialdom, when politicians or bureaucrats use language that is ambiguous.

== See also ==
- Beetlewing
