= Ellen Terry as Lady Macbeth =

Painting by John Singer Sargent

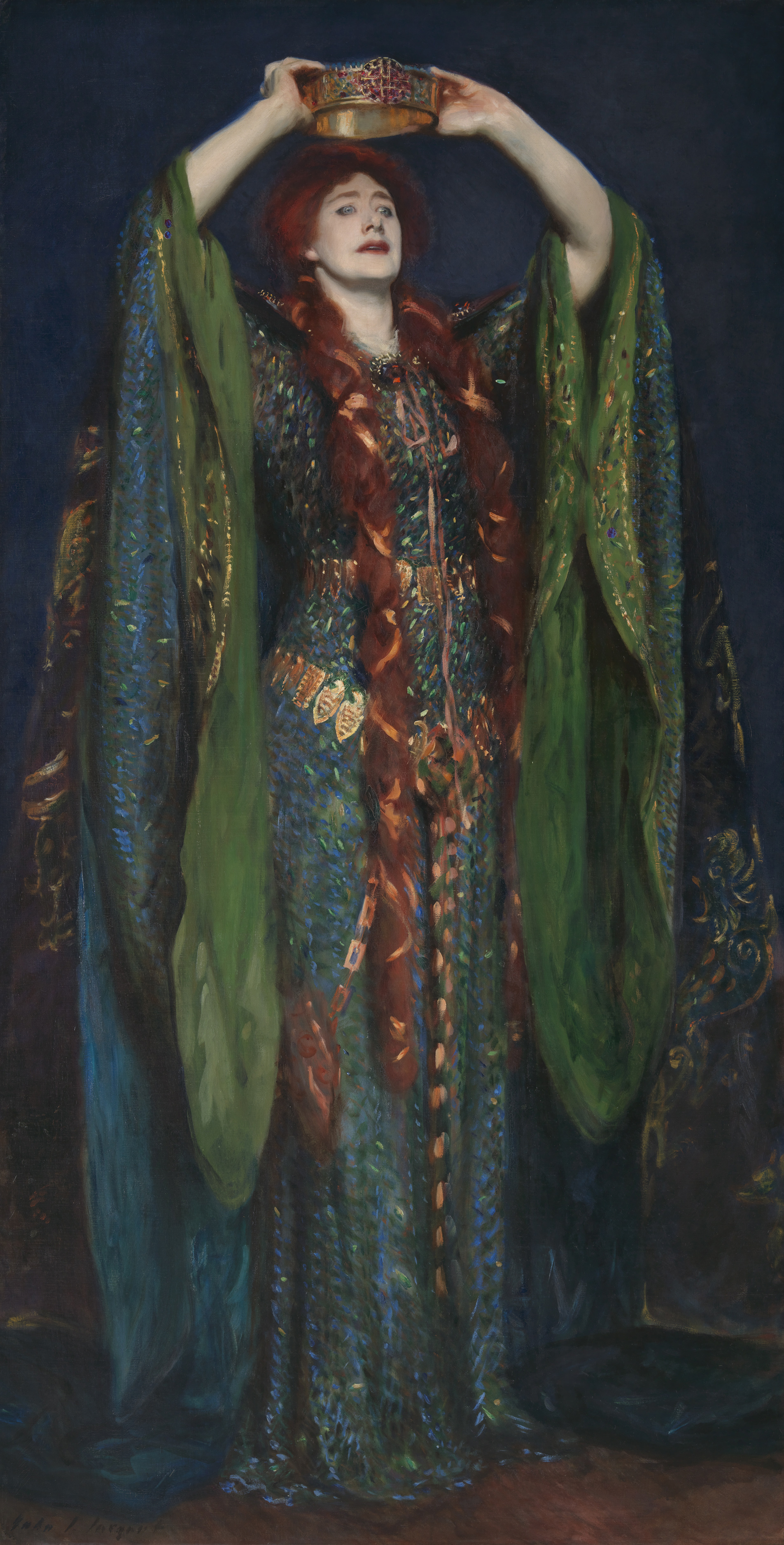
- Artist: John Singer Sargent
- Year: 1889
- Medium: Oil on canvas
- Dimensions: 221.0 cm × 114.5 cm (87.0 in × 45.1 in)
- Location: Tate Britain; London

Ellen Terry as Lady Macbeth is an oil painting by John Singer Sargent, now in Tate Britain, in London. Painted in 1889, it depicts actress Ellen Terry in a famous performance as Lady Macbeth in William Shakespeare's tragedy Macbeth, wearing a green dress decorated with iridescent beetle wings. The play was produced by Henry Irving at the Lyceum Theatre, London, with Irving also playing Macbeth opposite Terry. Sargent attended the opening night on 29 December 1888 and was inspired to paint Terry's portrait almost immediately.

== Dress ==
Terry's spectacular gown was designed by Alice Comyns Carr (1850–1927) and made in crochet by Ada Nettleship, using a soft green wool and blue tinsel yarn from Bohemia to create an effect similar to chain mail. It was embroidered with gold and decorated with 1,000 iridescent wing cases from the green jewel beetle, Sternocera aequisignata. The dress has a narrow border of Celtic designs worked out in red and white stones, is hemmed on all the edges, and girt with a gold belt. The design was inspired by a dress worn by Lady Randolph Churchill that was also trimmed with green beetle wing cases. It was designed to "look as much like soft chain armour... and yet have something that would give the appearance of the scales of a serpent".

Terry wrote to her daughter Edith Craig, "I wish you could see my dresses. They are superb, especially the first one: green beetles on it, and such a cloak! The photographs give no idea of it at all, for it is in colour that it is so splendid. The dark red hair is fine. The whole thing is Rossetti—rich stained-glass effects." Oscar Wilde quipped that "Lady Macbeth seems to be an economical housekeeper and evidently patronises local industries for her husband's clothes and servant's liveries, but she takes care to do all her own shopping in Byzantium."

The play was very successful, running for more than six months to packed houses. The costume was reused on many later tours, crossing the Atlantic to visit North America at least twice.

The dress was restored in a two-year project that began in 2009 when £50,000 had been raised to pay for the work. In 2011, after 1,300 hours of conservation work and a cost of £110,000, it was placed on display in Ellen Terry's former home, Smallhythe Place, near Tenterden in Kent. It has been described by the National Trust as "one of the most iconic and celebrated theatre costumes of the time".

== Painting ==
The painting depicts Terry standing erect, white faced, holding King Duncan's crown above her head, although the pose depicted did not feature in Irving's production. Long plaits of red hair bound with gold hang down to Terry's knees, over a heather-coloured velvet cloak embroidered with red animals (possibly griffins, or Scottish lions).

The canvas measures 221.0 centimetres (87.0 in) high by 114.5 centimetres (45.1 in) wide, with a heavy gold frame with Celtic motifs, probably designed by Sargent and made by Harold Roller. It was first exhibited at the summer exhibition at the New Gallery in 1889. In her memoirs, Terry called the painting the sensation of the year for 1889. It was next displayed at the Société Nationale des Beaux-Arts in Paris in 1890, the World's Columbian Exhibition in Chicago in 1893, and the 26th Autumn Exhibition in Liverpool in 1896. Irving bought the painting from Sargent for display in the Beefsteak Room at the Lyceum Theatre. After Irving's death in October 1905, the painting was sold at Christie's on 16 December 1905, and bought by an agent for Sir Joseph Joel Duveen, who donated it to the Tate Gallery in 1906.

The National Portrait Gallery holds a contemporaneous photograph of Ellen Terry wearing the dress. It also holds a grisaille oil sketch made by Sargent for Terry's golden jubilee programme in 1906, depicting Terry as Lady Macbeth standing at the entrance to a castle with robed attendants, based on an earlier colour drawing held at Smallhythe Place.

== Gallery ==
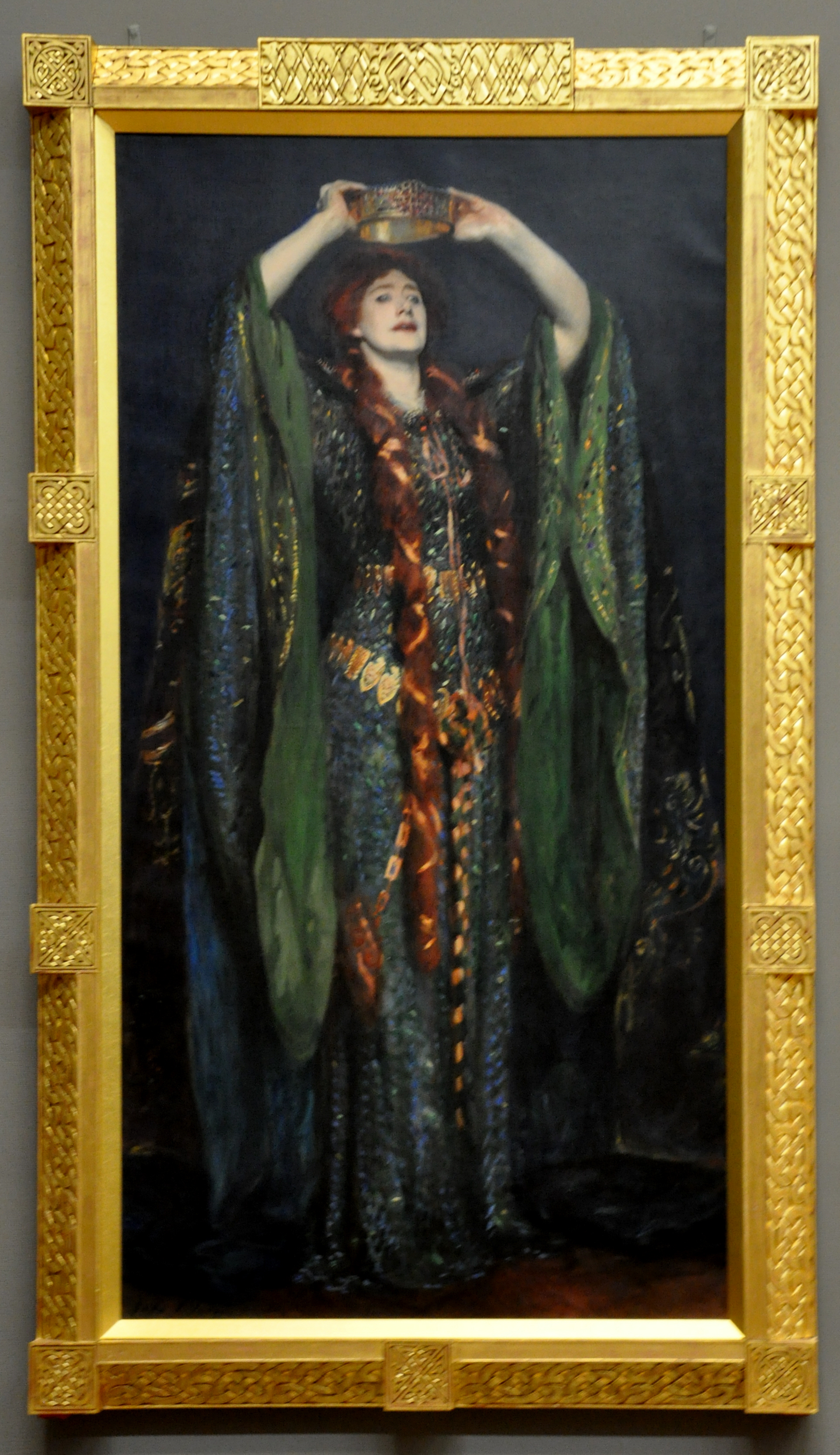
Painting at Tate Britain, including heavy gold frame with Celtic motifs

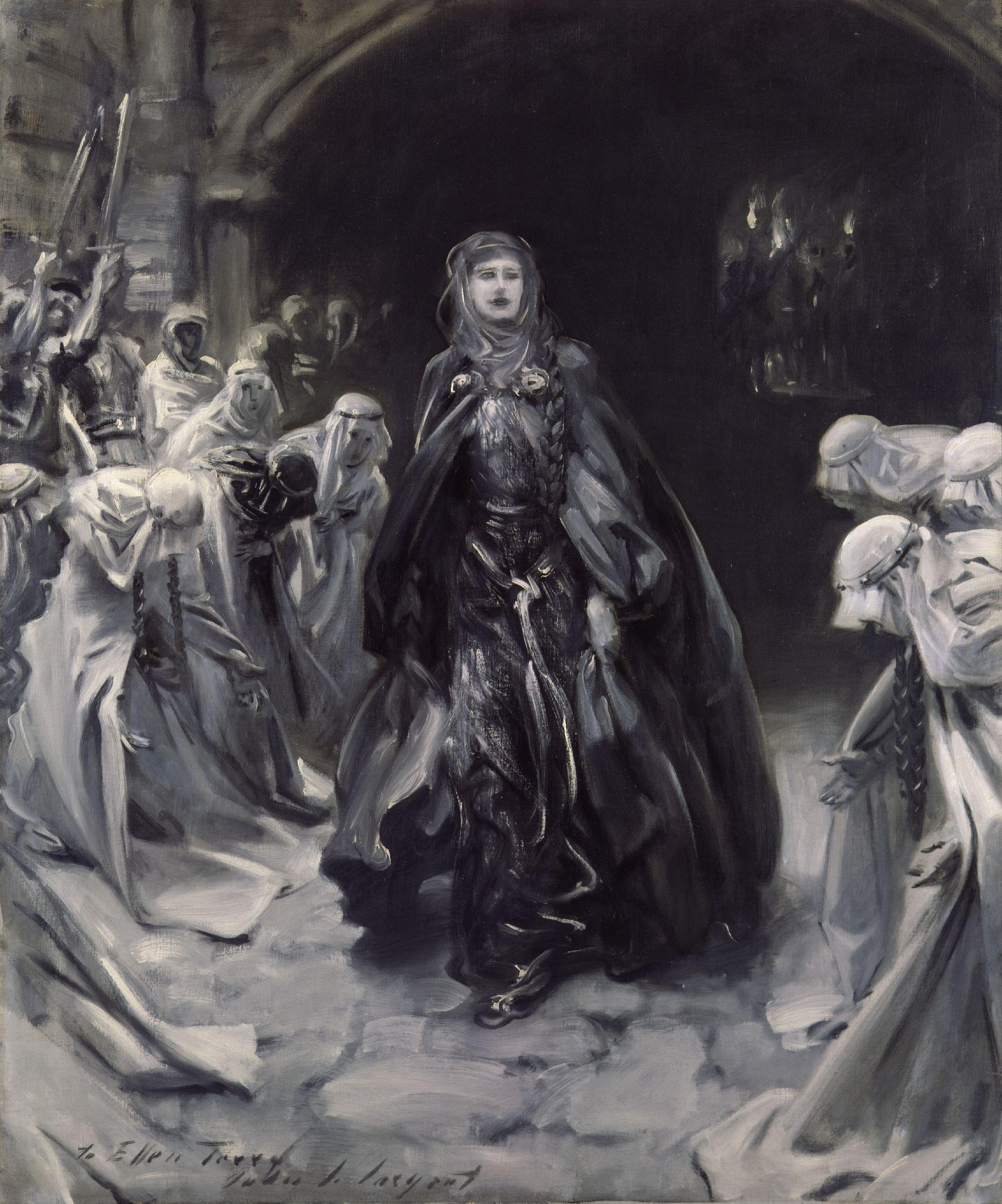
Drawing by Sargent for Terry's golden jubilee programme, 1906

== See also ==
- List of works by John Singer Sargent
