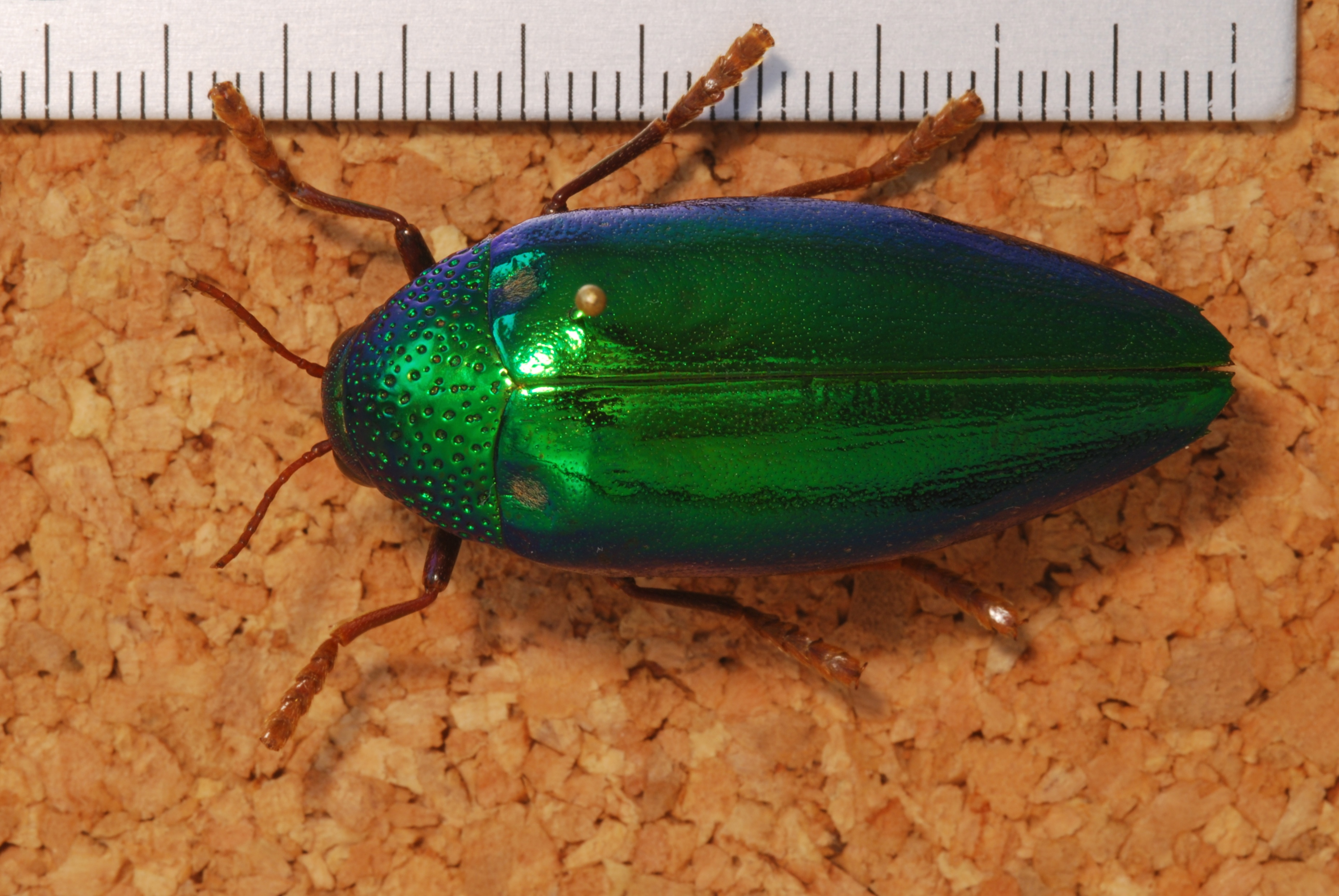

Scientific classification
- Domain: Eukaryota
- Kingdom: Animalia
- Phylum: Arthropoda
- Class: Insecta
- Order: Coleoptera
- Suborder: Polyphaga
- Infraorder: Elateriformia
- Family: Buprestidae
- Genus: Sternocera
- Species: S. ruficornis

Binomial name
- Sternocera ruficornis E. Saunders, 1866

= Sternocera ruficornis =

Species of beetle

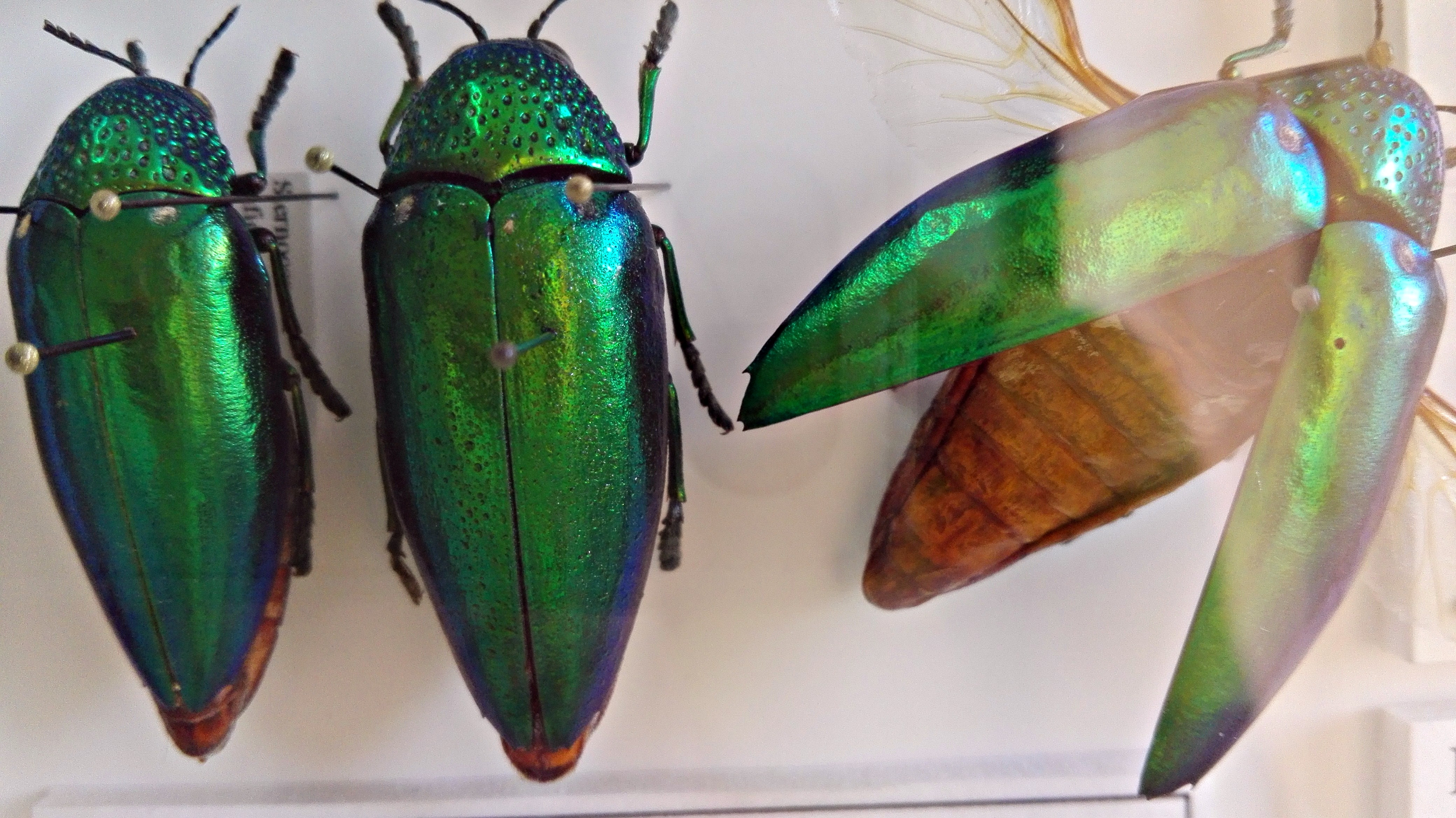

Sternocera ruficornis is a species of beetle belonging to the Buprestidae family. Its bright metallic green elytra are frequently used in jewellery making.

== Description ==
Sternocera ruficornis can reach a length of about 30–50 millimetres (1.2–2.0 in). The elytra and pronotum have a bright green iridescence and the pronotum is densely punctured. It is visually very similar to S. aequisignata; the major morphological difference is that the legs of S. ruficornis are red and those of S. aequisignata are green.

== Distribution and habitat ==
This species occurs across southern Asia. In Thailand it is prevalent in the north-east of the country where bamboo of the genus Arundinaria is found.

== Lifecycle ==
The female lays eggs singly in soil at the base of the host plants. Each female is capable of laying 5–12 eggs, which take 2 months to hatch. The hatched larva has five instar stages. Stages 1 to 4 remain in the soil for 3–4 months where they feed upon the roots of the adult host plants. The 5th instar can be found above ground, until it returns underground again to pupate. Adult beetles have a short lifespan of 1–3 weeks, though the complete life cycle takes up to two years.

== Relationship to humans ==
=== As food ===
Sternocera ruficornis and the similar S. aequisignata are both consumed by humans as a source of food in northern Thailand, Laos, and China. This is one of the major sources of their decline in that area.
