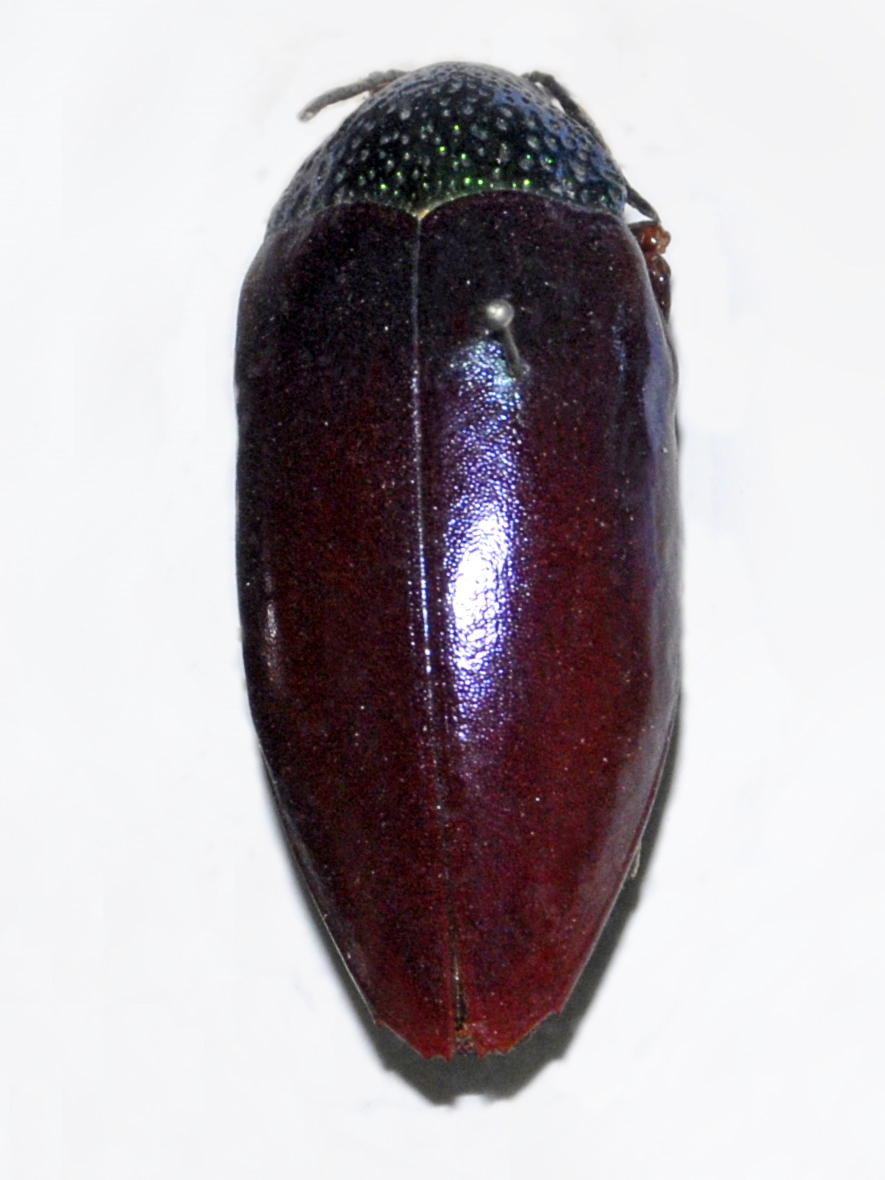
- Sternocera chrysis var. crysodioides. Mounted specimen.

Scientific classification
- Domain: Eukaryota
- Kingdom: Animalia
- Phylum: Arthropoda
- Class: Insecta
- Order: Coleoptera
- Suborder: Polyphaga
- Infraorder: Elateriformia
- Family: Buprestidae
- Genus: Sternocera
- Species: S. chrysis

Binomial name
- Sternocera chrysis (Fabricius, 1775)

= Sternocera chrysis =

Species of beetle

Sternocera chrysis is a species of beetles belonging to the Buprestidae family. It has a dark reddish elytra and dark pronotum.

== Subspecies ==
- Sternocera chrysis chrysis (Fabricius, 1775)
- Sternocera chrysis chrysioides Laporte & Gory, 1837
- Sternocera chrysis nitidicollis Laporte & Gory, 1835

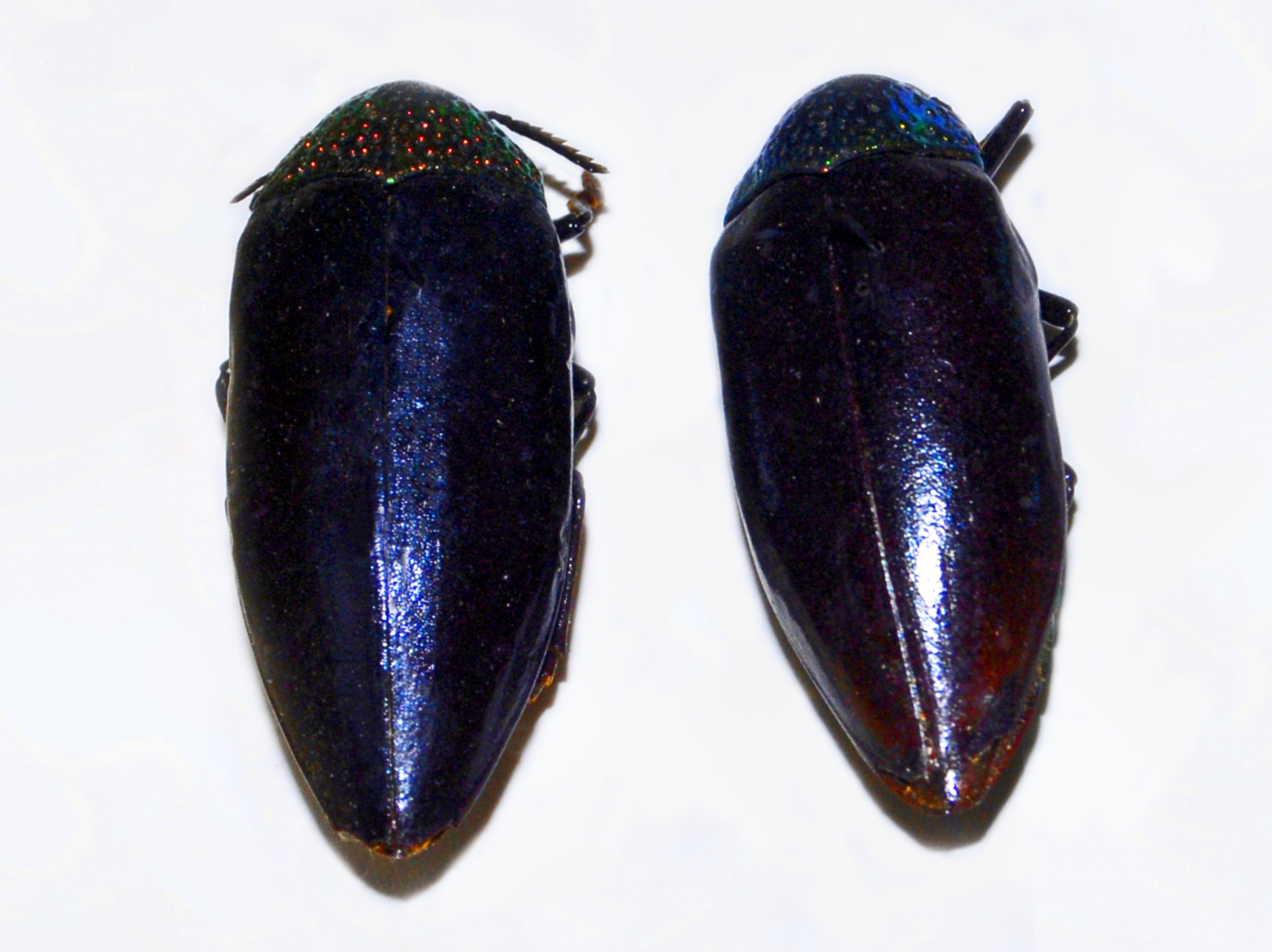
Sternocera chrysis

== Description ==
The basic color of the elytra is coppery-brown, while pronotum is usually metallic green.

== Distribution ==
This species can be found in India, Iran, Sri Lanka, Pakistan, Beluchistan, Nepal, Burma, Thailand, Laos, Vietnam and China.
