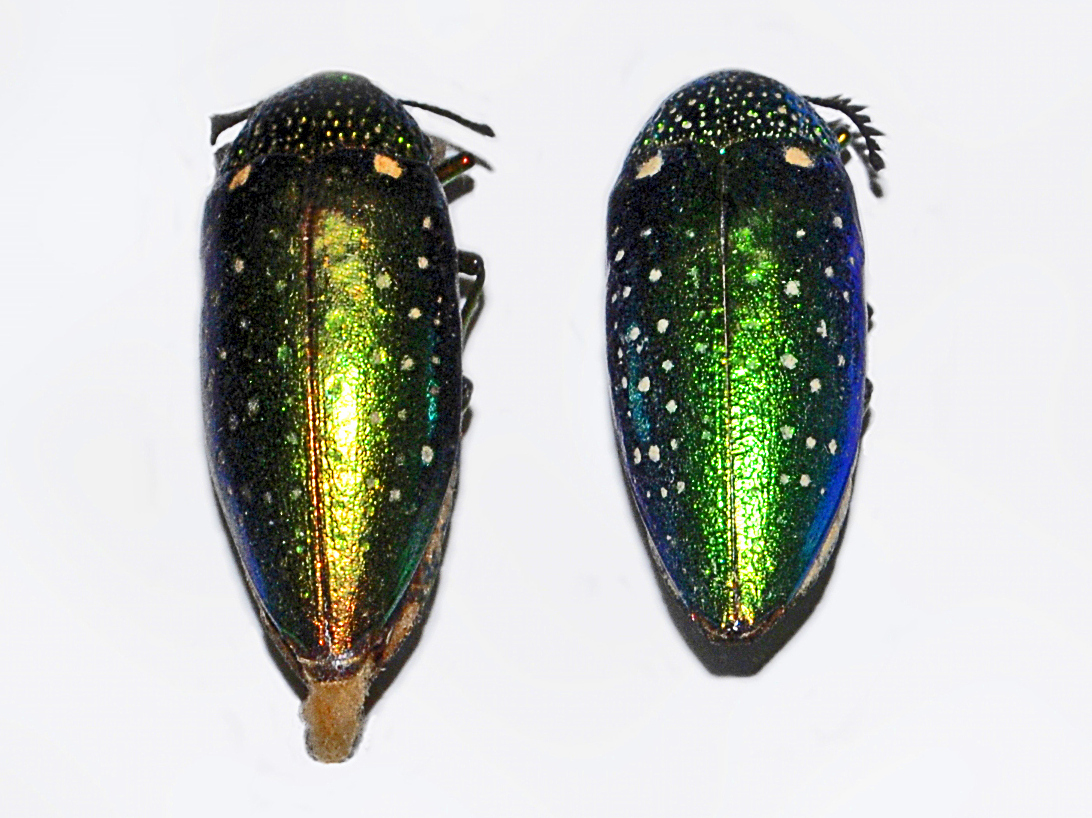
- Mounted specimen

Scientific classification
- Kingdom: Animalia
- Phylum: Arthropoda
- Class: Insecta
- Order: Coleoptera
- Suborder: Polyphaga
- Infraorder: Elateriformia
- Family: Buprestidae
- Genus: Sternocera
- Species: S. sternicornis

Binomial name
- Sternocera sternicornis (Linnaeus, 1758)

= Sternocera sternicornis =

Species of beetle

Sternocera sternicornis is a species of beetle belonging to the Buprestidae family.

== Subspecies ==
- Sternocera sternicornis orientalis (Herbst, 1801)
- Sternocera sternicornis sternicoris (Linnaeus, 1758)

== Description ==
Sternocera sternicornis can reach a length of about 45 millimetres (1.8 in). The basic color of the elytra is metallic bright green, with small yellow or ash-colored eyespots. Two larger spots are present at the base of the elytra. The surface of the thorax is covered with deeply impressed punctures. The antennae and tarsi are blackish.

== Distribution ==
This species can be found in India.
