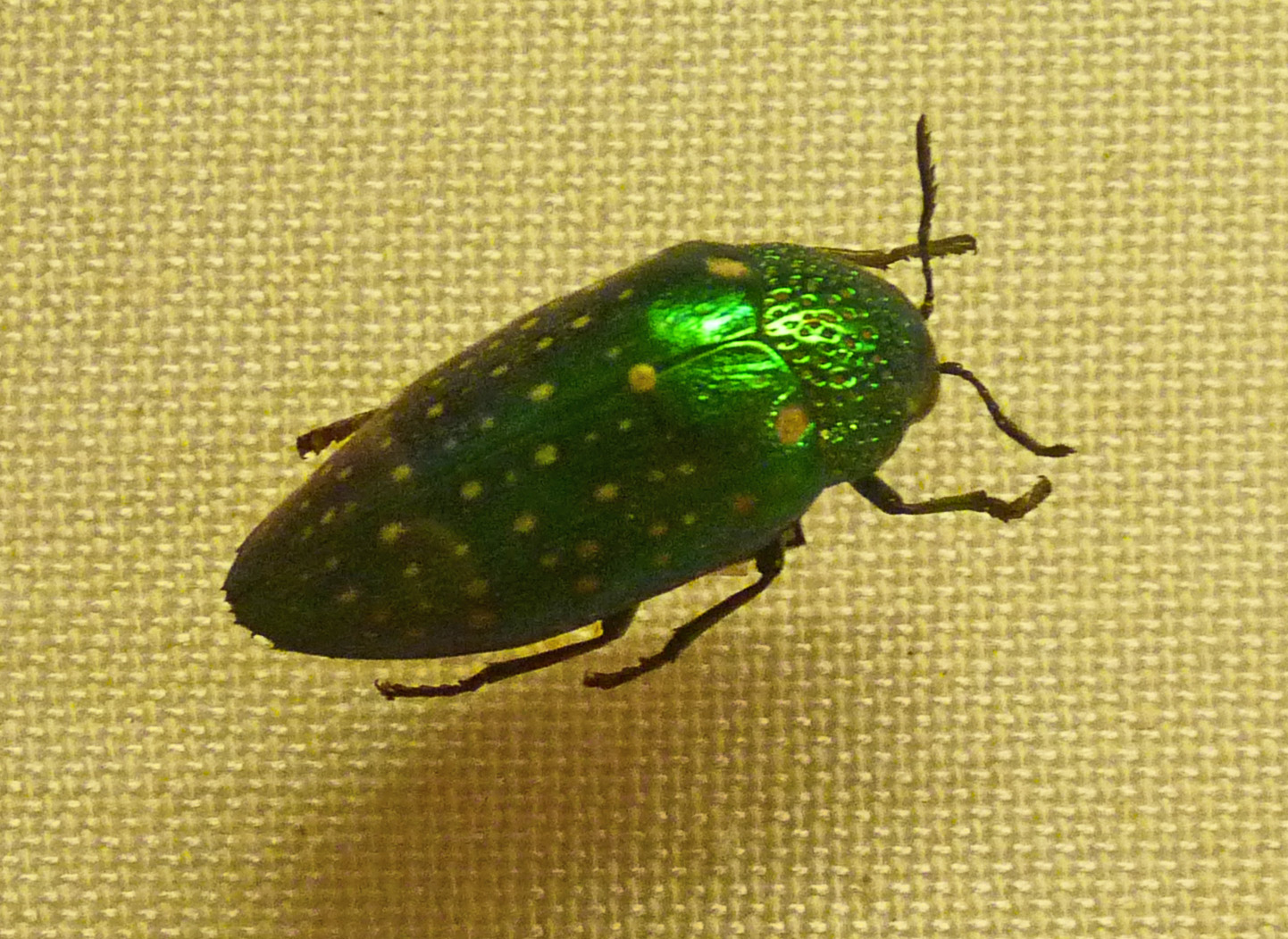
- Sternocera chrysis

Scientific classification
- Kingdom: Animalia
- Phylum: Arthropoda
- Class: Insecta
- Order: Coleoptera
- Suborder: Polyphaga
- Infraorder: Elateriformia
- Family: Buprestidae
- Subfamily: Julodinae
- Genus: Sternocera; Eschscholtz, 1829

Species
- See text

= Sternocera =

Genus of beetles

Sternocera is a genus of jewel beetles belonging to the Julodinae subfamily.

== Characteristics ==
There are 26 species in this genus. Some species—S. aequisignata and S. aurosignata—are used for beetlewing craft because of their iridescent wings.

== Species ==
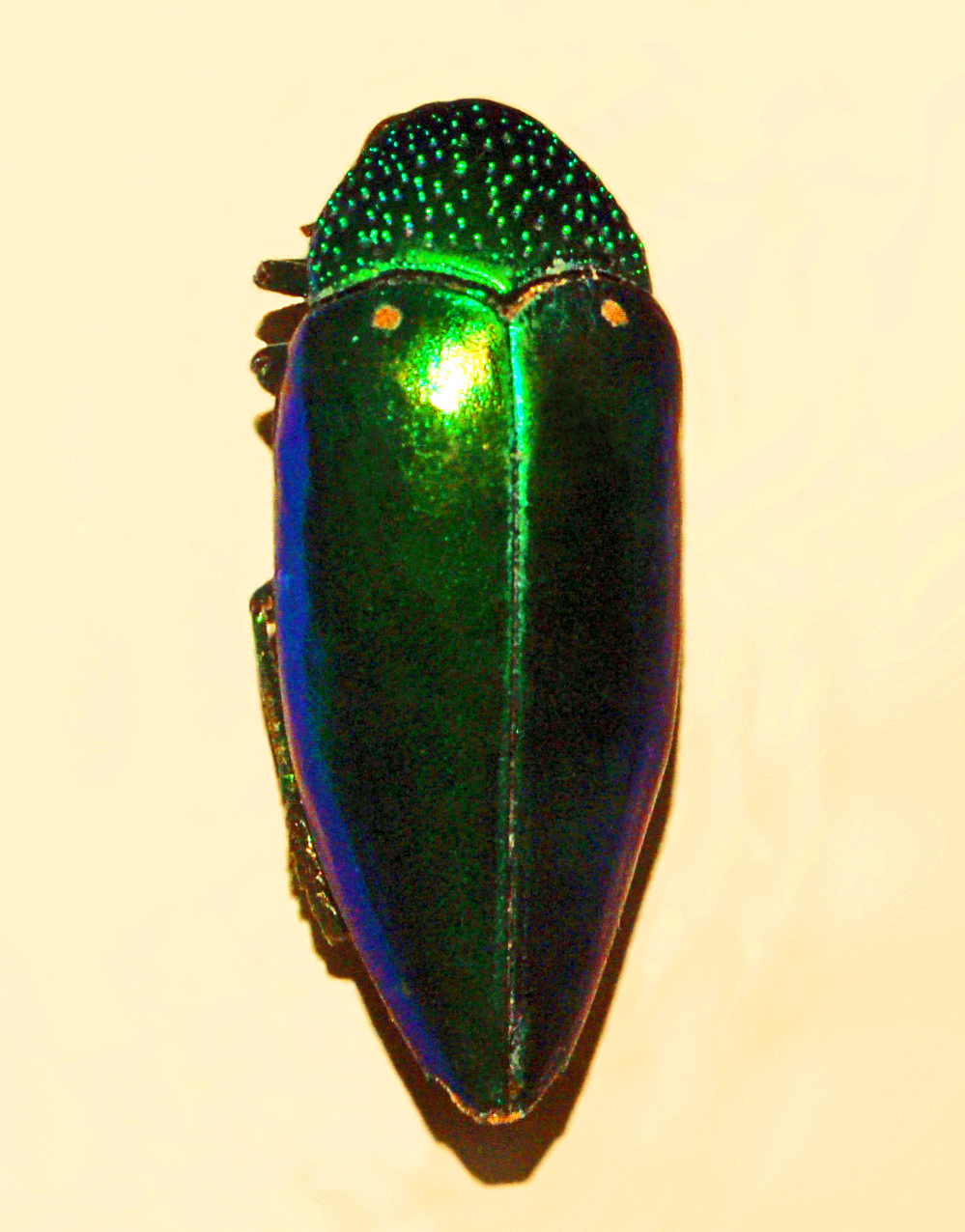
Sternocera aequisignata

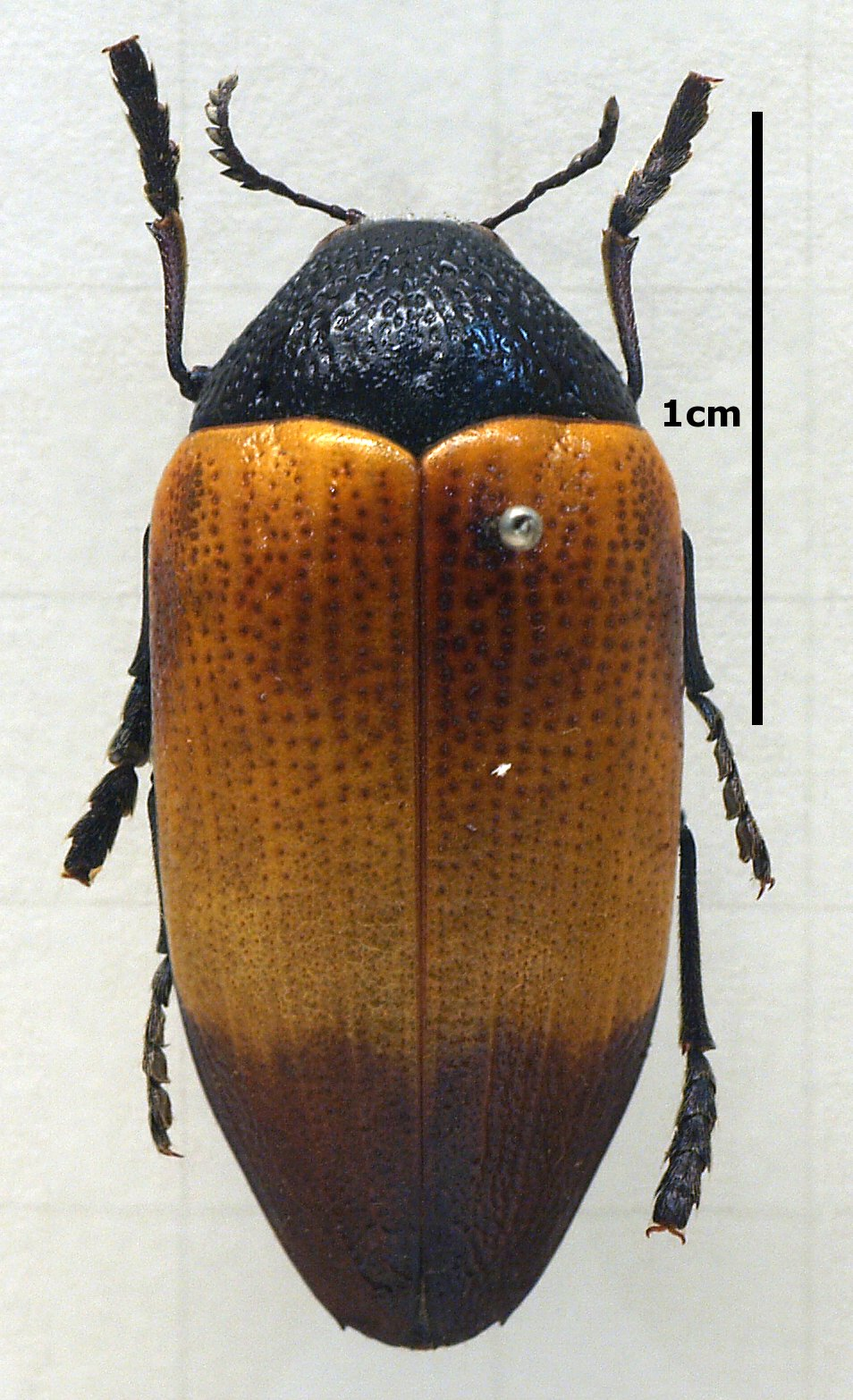
Sternocera hunteri

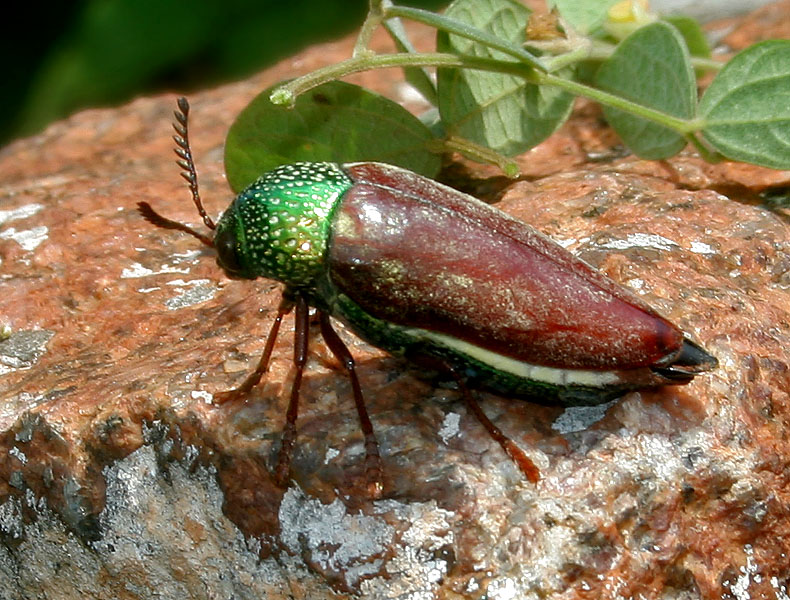
Sternocera sternicornis orientalis from India

- Sternocera aequisignata Saunders, 1866
- Sternocera aurosignata Thomson, 1878
- Sternocera cariosicollis Fairmaire, 1884
- Sternocera castanea (Olivier, 1790)
- Sternocera chrysis (Fabricius, 1775) - type species
- Sternocera dasypleuros Kollar, 1848
- Sternocera diardii Gory, 1840
- Sternocera discedens Kolbe, 1901
- Sternocera duvivieri Kerremans, 1898
- Sternocera feldspathica White, 1843
- Sternocera foveopubens Fairmaire, 1884
- Sternocera funebris Boheman, 1860
- Sternocera hildebrandti Harold, 1878
- Sternocera hunteri Waterhouse, 1889
- Sternocera interrupta (Olivier, 1790)
- Sternocera iris Harold, 1878
- Sternocera klugii Thomson, 1859
- Sternocera laevigata (Olivier, 1790)
- Sternocera marseuli Obenberger, 1923
- Sternocera multipunctata Saunders, 1869
- Sternocera ngorongorensis Holm & Gussmann, 1992
- Sternocera orissa Buquet, 1837
- Sternocera pulchra Waterhouse, 1879
- Sternocera ruficornis Saunders, 1866
- Sternocera sternicornis (Linnaeus, 1758)
- Sternocera syriaca Saunders, 1874
- Sternocera tricolor Kerremans, 1886

== Gallery ==
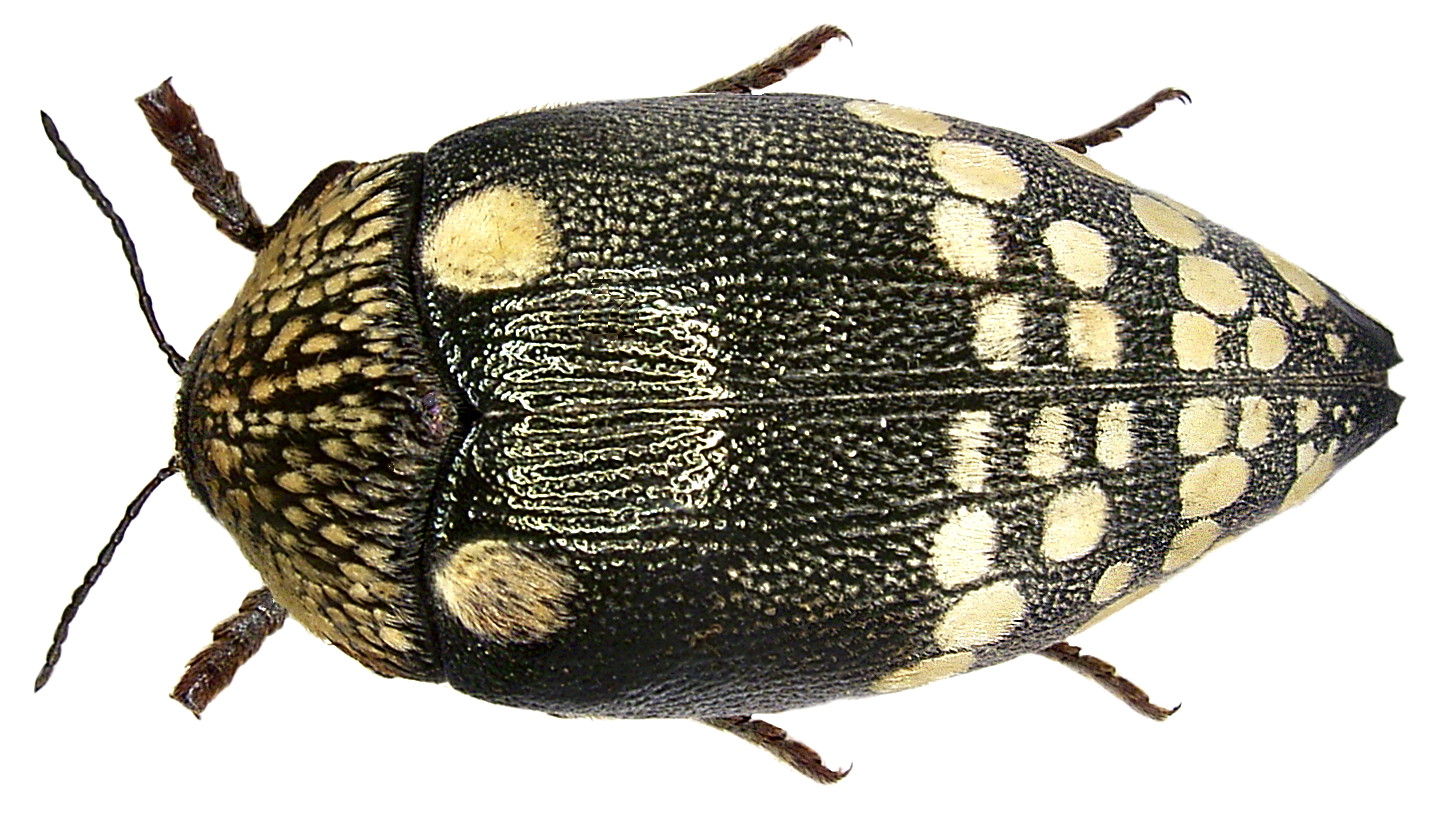
Sternocera castanea boucardii

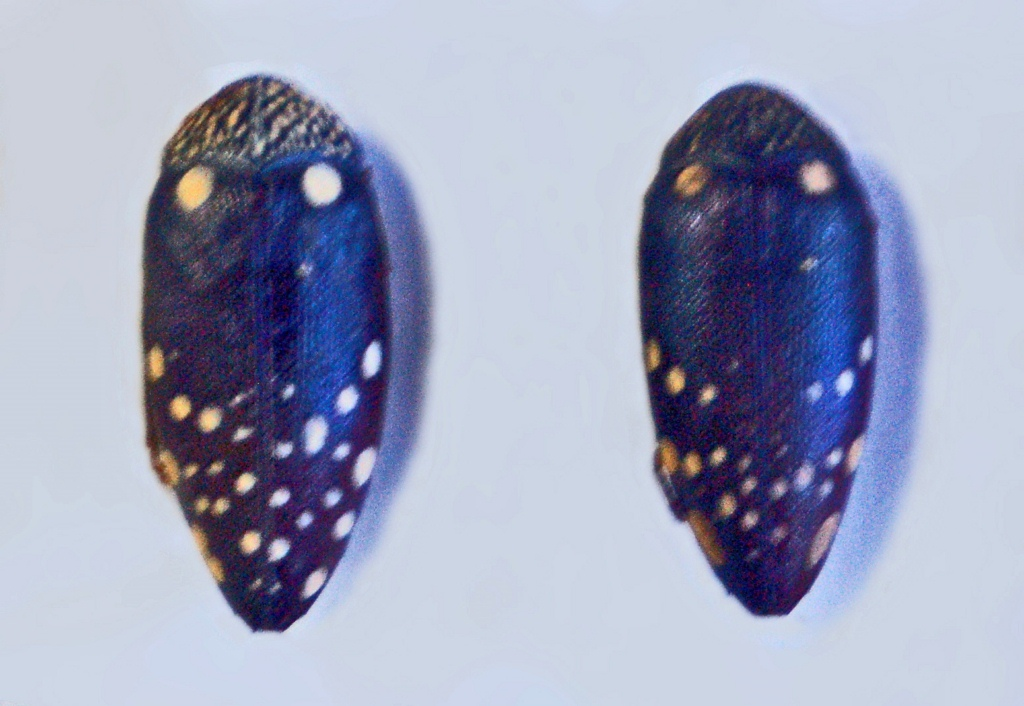
Sternocera castanea boucardii, mounted specimen at National Museum (Prague)

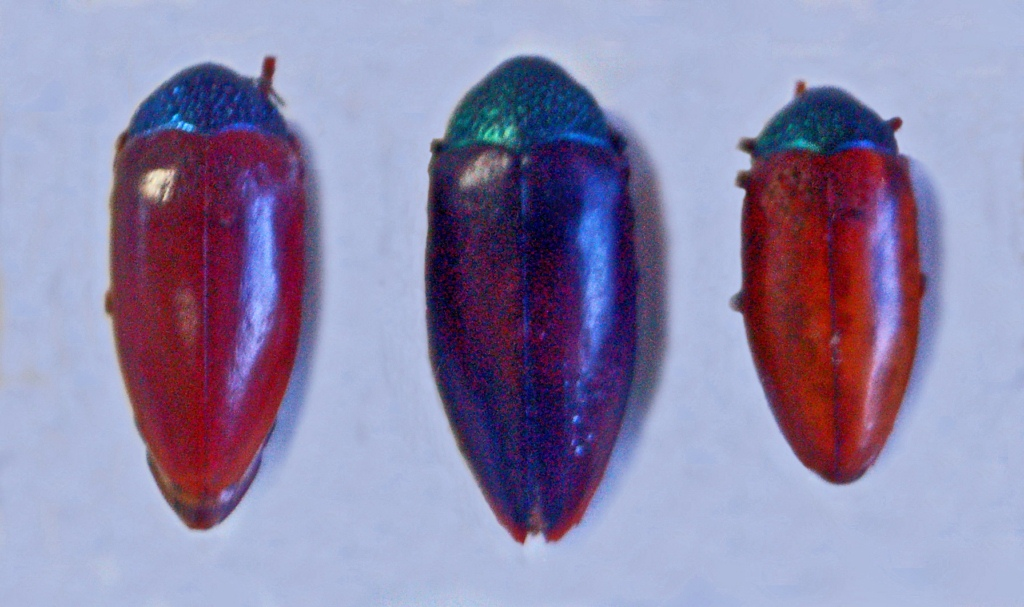
Sternocera chrysis, mounted specimen at National Museum (Prague)

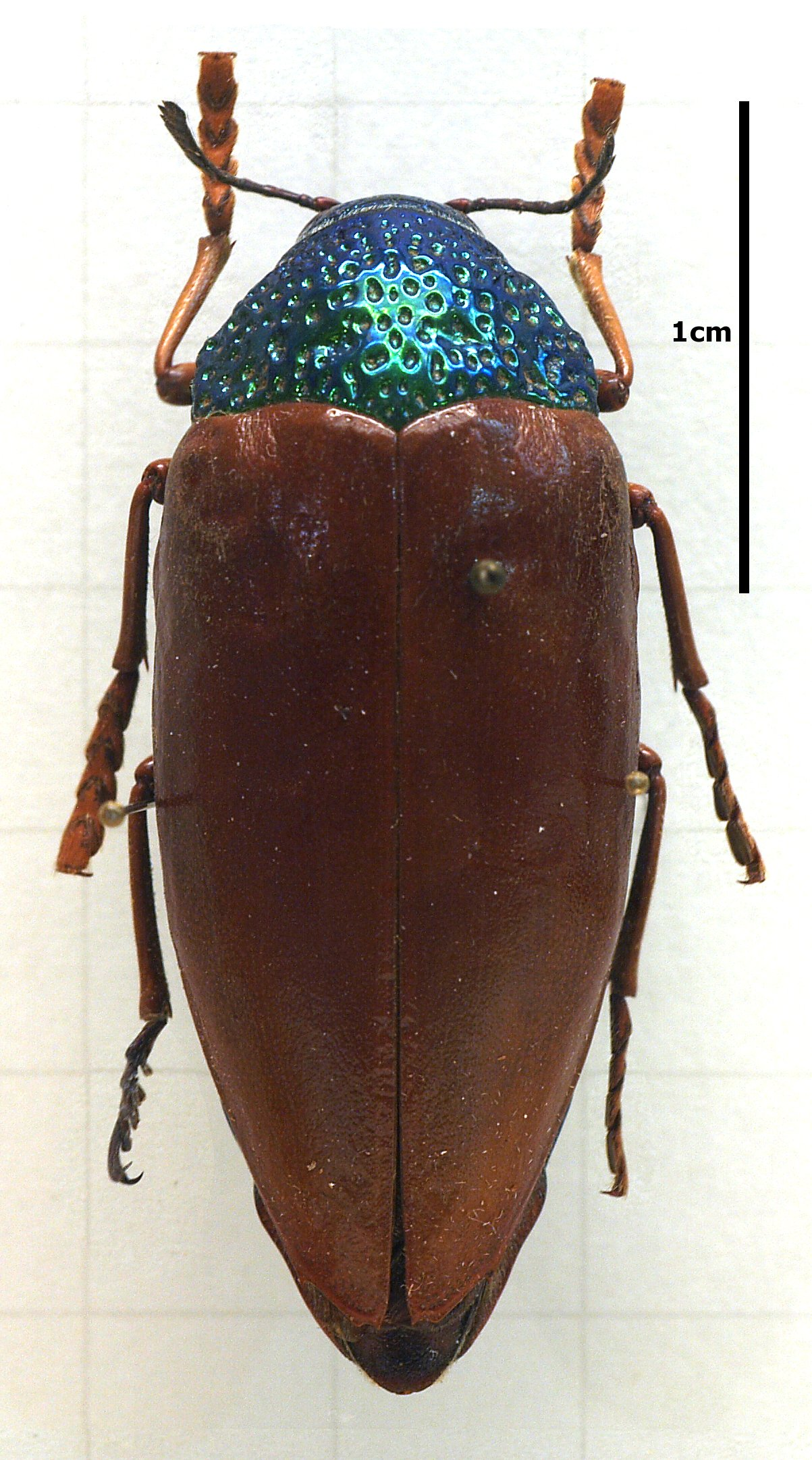
Sternocera chrysis chrysidoides from India - mounted specimen

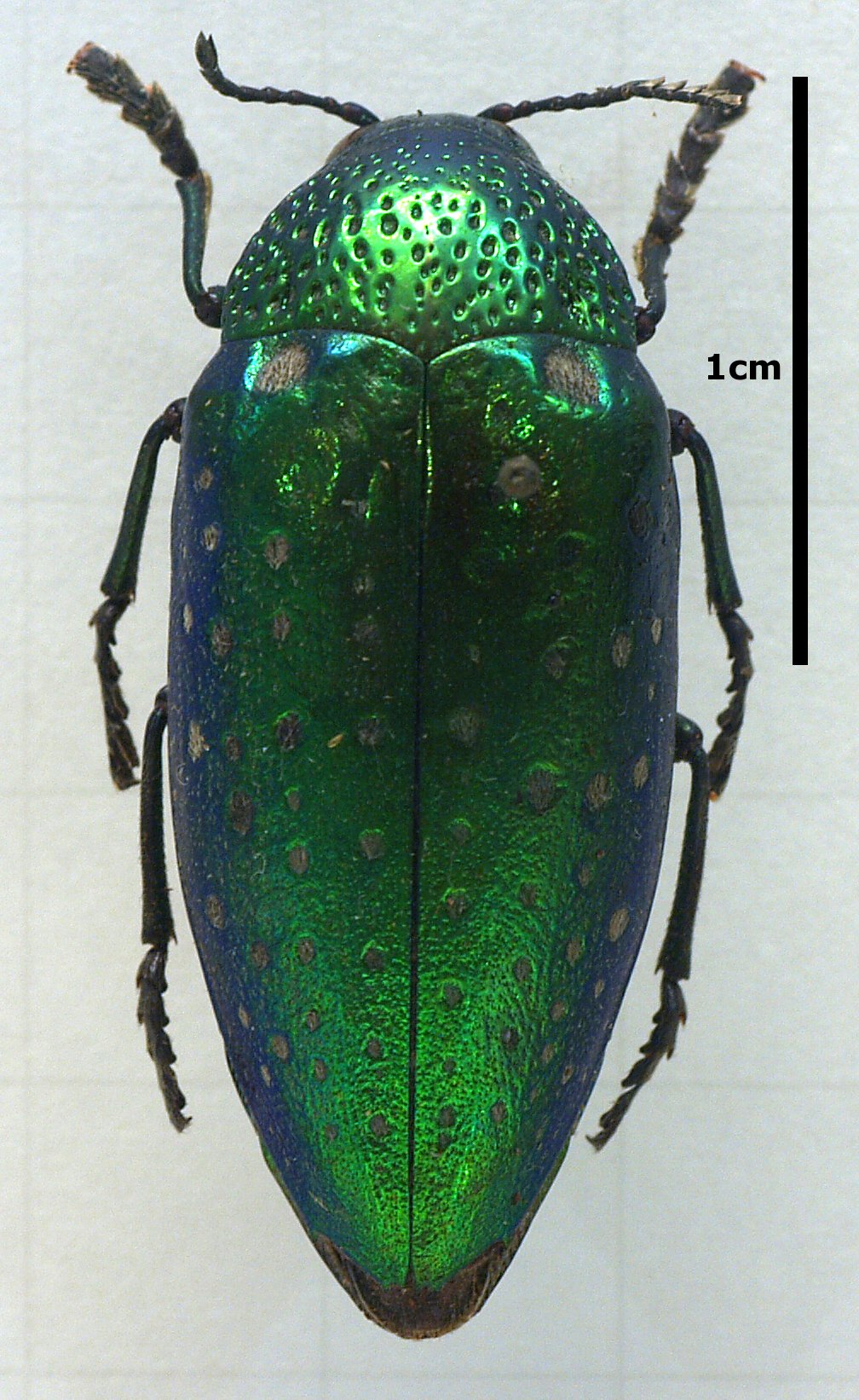
Sternocera sternicornis, from Bengal - mounted specimen
