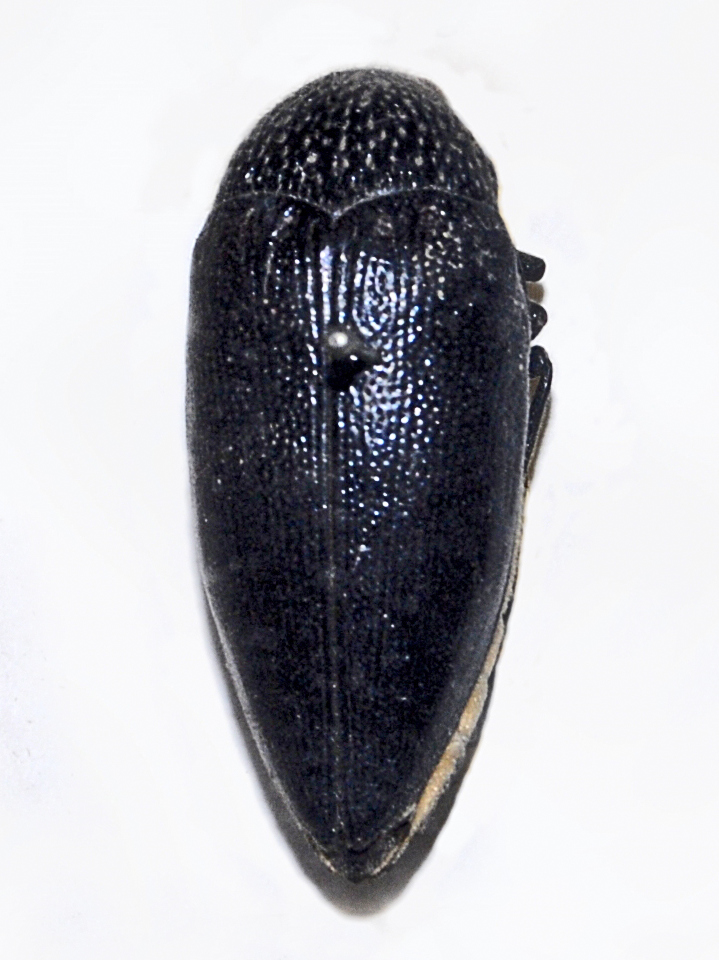
- Mounted specimen

Scientific classification
- Domain: Eukaryota
- Kingdom: Animalia
- Phylum: Arthropoda
- Class: Insecta
- Order: Coleoptera
- Suborder: Polyphaga
- Infraorder: Elateriformia
- Family: Buprestidae
- Genus: Sternocera
- Species: S. funebris

Binomial name
- Sternocera funebris Boheman, 1860

= Sternocera funebris =

Species of beetle

Sternocera funebris is a species of beetles belonging to the Buprestidae family.

== Distribution ==
This species can be found in Zimbabwe.
