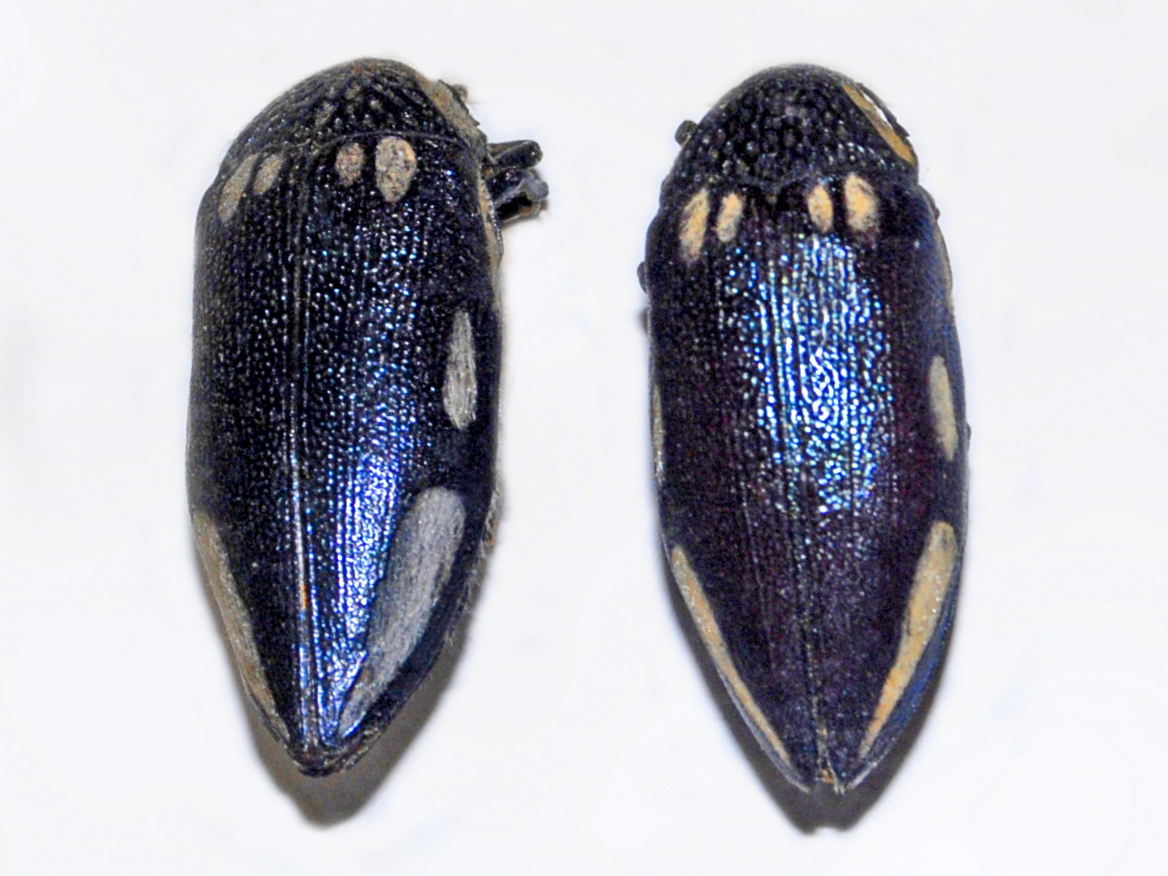
- Mounted specimen

Scientific classification
- Domain: Eukaryota
- Kingdom: Animalia
- Phylum: Arthropoda
- Class: Insecta
- Order: Coleoptera
- Suborder: Polyphaga
- Infraorder: Elateriformia
- Family: Buprestidae
- Genus: Sternocera
- Species: S. orissa

Binomial name
- Sternocera orissa Buquet, 1837

= Sternocera orissa =

Species of beetle

Sternocera orissa, the giant jewel beetle, is a species of beetles belonging to the Buprestidae family.

== Subspecies ==
- Sternocera orissa abita Holm & Gussmann, 1992
- Sternocera orissa bertolonii Thomson, 1878
- Sternocera orissa lanifica Erichson, 1843
- Sternocera orissa luctifera Klug, 1855
- Sternocera orissa orissa Buquet, 1837
- Sternocera orissa variabilis Kerrmans, 1886

== Description ==
Sternocera orissa can reach a length of about 35–45 millimetres (1.4–1.8 in). The basic color of the elytra is greenish-black or bluish-black, with whitish to yellowish eyespots and markings.

== Distribution ==
This species can be found in Botswana, southern Malawi, Namibia, South Africa, Zambia, Mozambique, Zimbabwe and in Tanzania.
