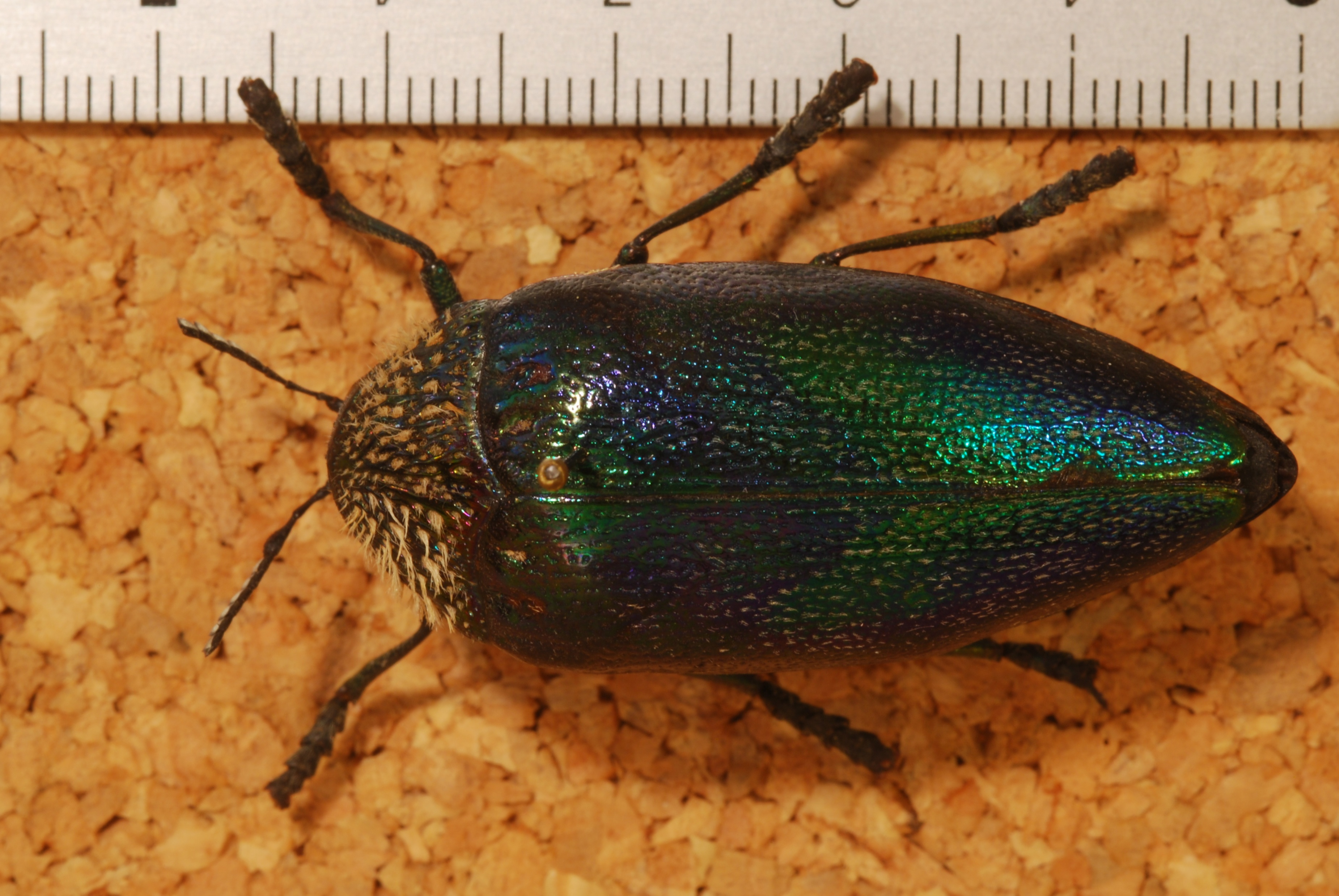

Scientific classification
- Kingdom: Animalia
- Phylum: Arthropoda
- Class: Insecta
- Order: Coleoptera
- Suborder: Polyphaga
- Infraorder: Elateriformia
- Family: Buprestidae
- Genus: Sternocera
- Species: S. pulchra

Binomial name
- Sternocera pulchra Waterhouse, 1879

= Sternocera pulchra =

Species of beetle

Sternocera pulchra is a beetle species found in Tanzania.
