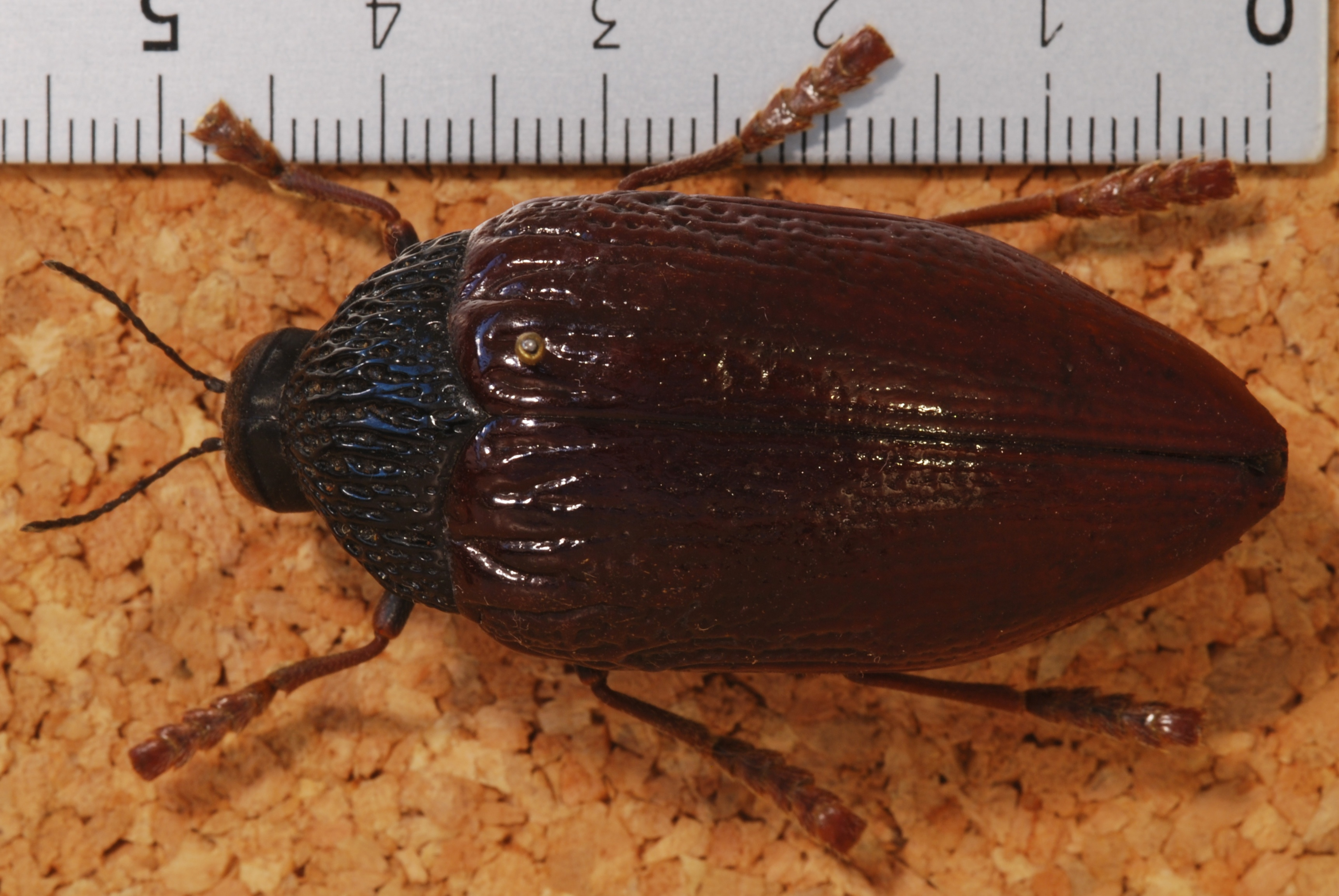
- Jewel Beetle (Sternocera hildebrandti)

Scientific classification
- Domain: Eukaryota
- Kingdom: Animalia
- Phylum: Arthropoda
- Class: Insecta
- Order: Coleoptera
- Suborder: Polyphaga
- Infraorder: Elateriformia
- Family: Buprestidae
- Genus: Sternocera
- Species: S. hildebrandti

Binomial name
- Sternocera hildebrandti Harold, 1878

= Sternocera hildebrandti =

Species of beetle

Sternocera hildebrandti is a species of beetles belonging to the Buprestidae family. The elytra of the brown to red brown jewel beetles show a medium reflectance in the near-infrared. The elytra are very hard and have been used by the Wataita as clattering earrings for special ceremonies. The species was named in honor of Johann Maria Hildebrandt by his father.

== Distribution ==
This species can be found in East Africa from Ethiopia to the south of Tanzania for example in akazia trees.
