= Beetlewing =

Art made with the wings of beetles

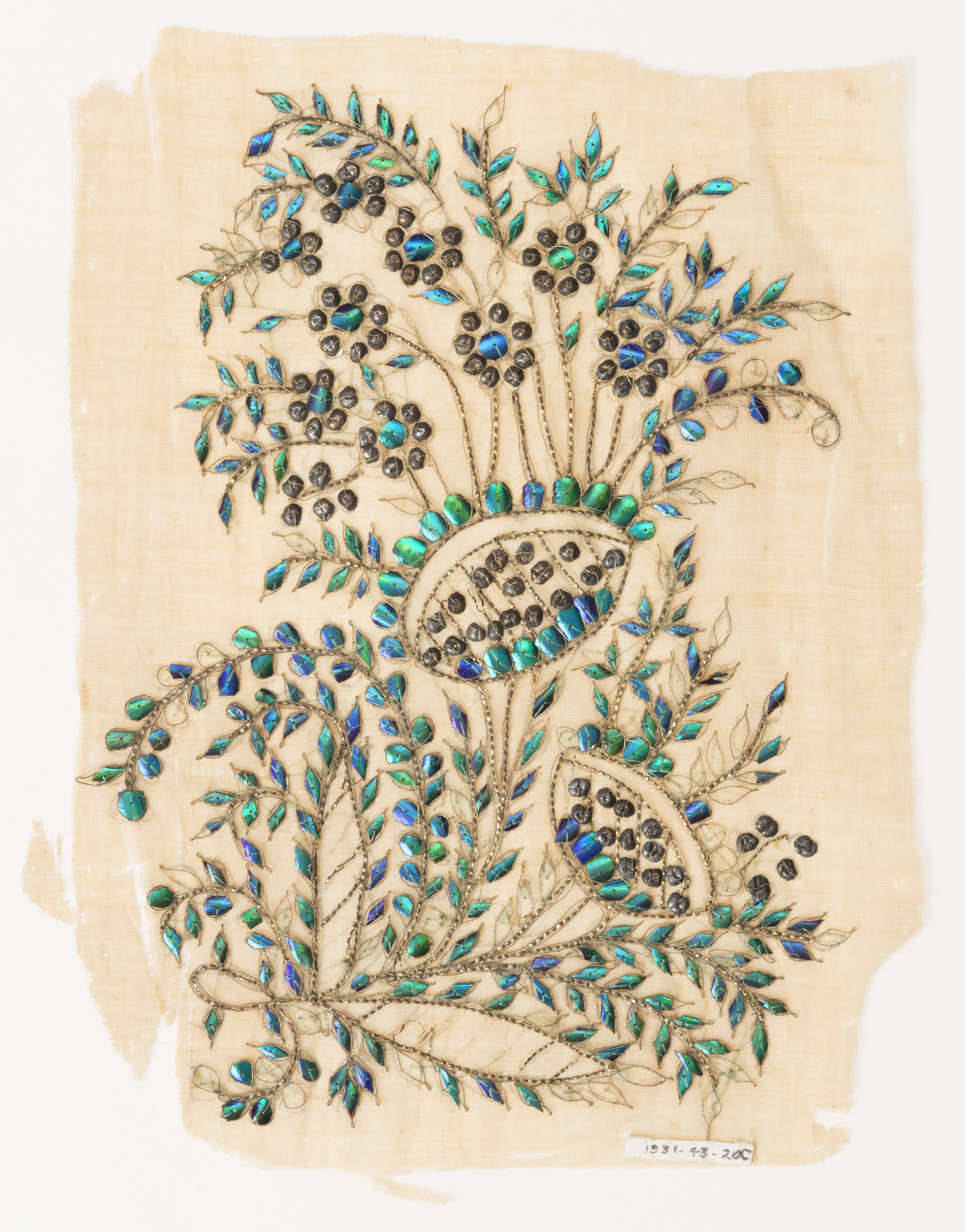
Off-white cotton sheer ground with an embroidered design of a stylized floral spray: The vines are executed in gold foil strips, the small flowers in gilt sequins, and the leaves in beetle elytra.

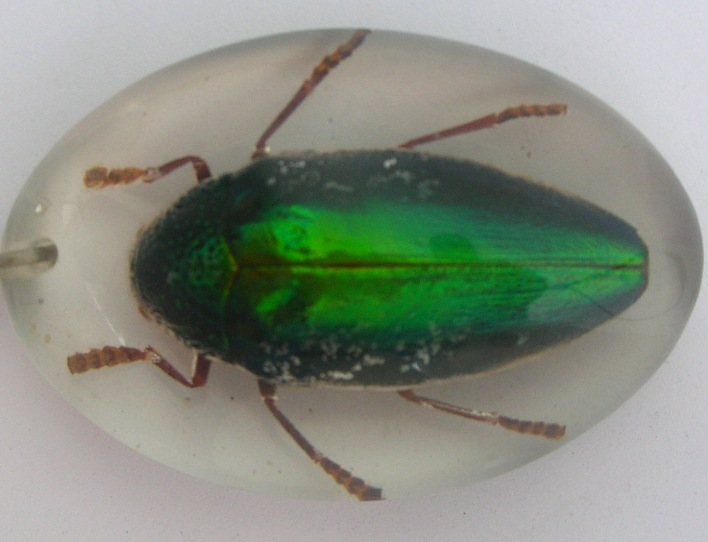
The beetle Sternocera aequisignata is used in Thailand for beetlewing decoration

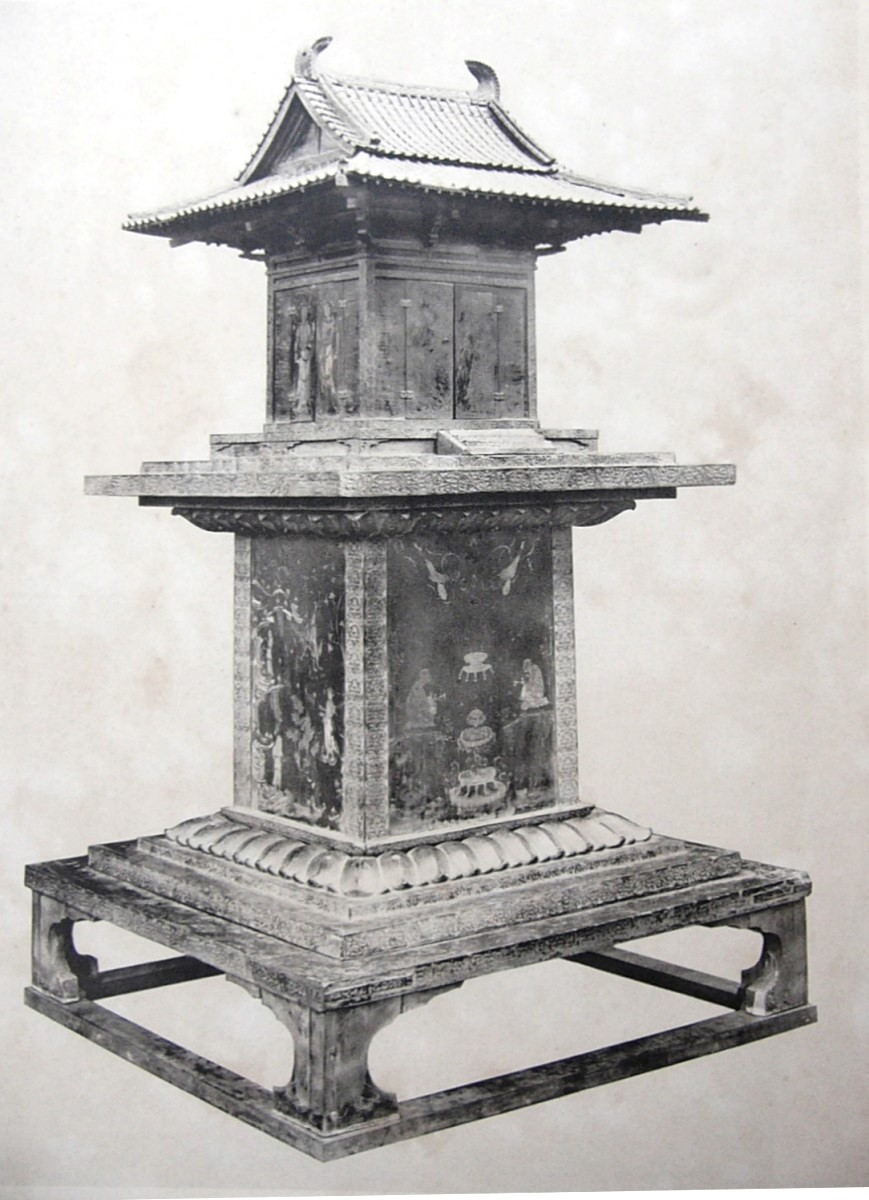
Tamamushi Shrine, Horyu-ji, Nara Prefecture, Japan, Asuka Period, decorated with lacquer and oil painting on wood, gilt bronze plaques, and the iridescent wings of jewel beetle (Tamamushi)

Beetlewing, or beetlewing art, is an ancient craft technique using iridescent beetle wings practiced traditionally in Thailand, Myanmar, India, China, and Japan. Notable beetlewing garments include Lady Curzon's peacock dress (1903) and a costume dress worn by actress Ellen Terry as Lady Macbeth, depicted in the painting Ellen Terry as Lady Macbeth (1889).

== Tradition ==
In some of the ancient cultures of Asia, beetlewing pieces commonly were attached as an adornment to paintings, textiles, and jewelry. Different species of metallic wood-boring beetle wings were used depending on the region, but traditionally the most valued were those from beetles belonging to genus Sternocera. Their wings were valued for their beautiful and hardy metallic emerald iridescence. The shiny appearance of beetlewings is long-lasting. They are surprisingly durable if subject to normal nonabusive use.

In Thailand, beetlewings of wood–boring beetles Sternocera species (Thai: แมลงทับ), such as Sternocera aequisignata, were preferred to decorate clothing (shawls and Sabai cloth) and jewelry in former court circles. The beetles have a short lifespan of 3 to 4 weeks in their adult stage. To avoid killing the beetles, only those that die of natural causes are collected.

In 19th-century India, exquisite masterpieces of embroidered textiles were produced using beetlewing pieces. These cloth items have survived the passage of time without losing their splendor.

In some instances, the beetlewings retain their natural sparkle, though the cloth surrounding them may have decayed.

The species of beetle traditionally used in decorative work in Japan is Chrysochroa fulgidissima, known also as Tamamushi.

== Survival ==
In Thailand, this ancient tradition has mostly died out. In Bangkok, rare pieces of crafts and jewelry made with beetlewing are displayed at the Dusit Palace complex of King Chulalongkorn (Rama V), now a museum.

Thanks to the encouragement and support of Queen Sirikit, efforts are being made to preserve this traditional art at the Chitralada Center by supporting artisans who have kept the skill alive. Modern beetlewing work is usually applied on simple items, such as earrings and collage work. These are marketed mostly through tourist-oriented shops.

== See also ==
- Buprestidae (jewel beetles)
- Beadwork
