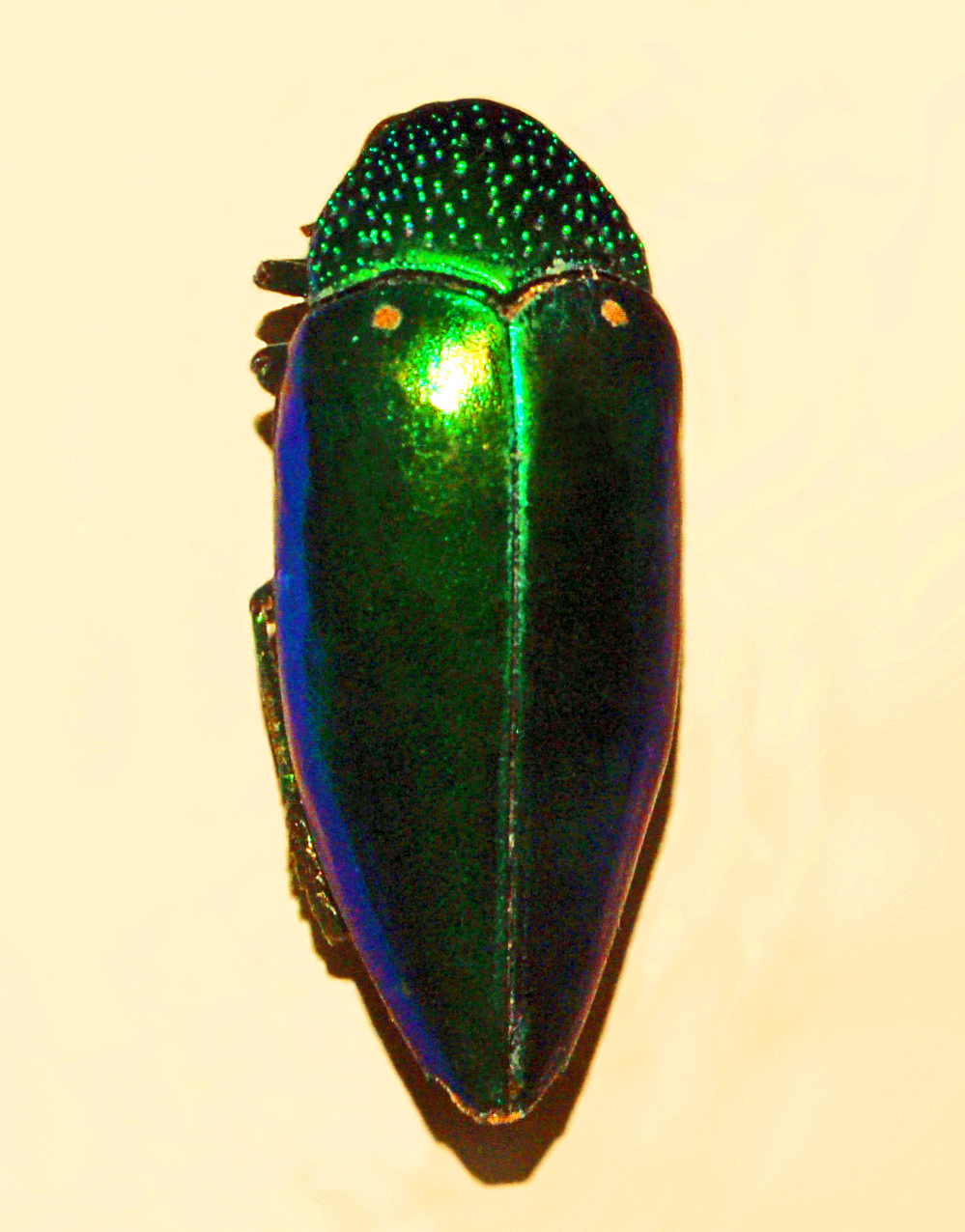
- Sternocera aequisignata from Myanmar

Scientific classification
- Domain: Eukaryota
- Kingdom: Animalia
- Phylum: Arthropoda
- Class: Insecta
- Order: Coleoptera
- Suborder: Polyphaga
- Infraorder: Elateriformia
- Family: Buprestidae
- Subfamily: Julodinae
- Genus: Sternocera
- Species: S. aequisignata

Binomial name
- Sternocera aequisignata E. Saunders, 1866

= Sternocera aequisignata =

Species of beetle

Sternocera aequisignata is a species of jewel beetles belonging to the subfamily Julodinae. Its bright metallic green elytra are frequently used in jewellery making.

== Description ==
Sternocera aequisignata can reach a length of about 30–50 millimetres (1.2–2.0 in). Elytra and pronotum have a beautiful metallic emerald iridescence that shows no to very weak reflectance in the near-infrared. The Pronotum is densely punctured.

== Distribution ==
This species occurs across southern Asia, including India, Myanmar, Thailand to southern Vietnam.

== Lifecyle ==
The female lays eggs singly in soil at the base of the host plants. Each female is capable of laying 5–12 eggs, which take 2 months to hatch. The hatched larva has five instar stages. Stages 1 to 4 remain in the soil for 3–4 months where they feed upon the roots of the adult host plants. The 5th instar can be found above ground, until it returns underground again to pupate. Adult beetles have a short lifespan of 1–3 weeks, though the complete life cycle takes up to two years.

== Relationship to humans ==
=== As food ===
S. aequisignata and the similar S. ruficornis are both consumed by humans as a source of food in northern Thailand, Laos, and China. This is one of the major sources of their decline in that area.

=== In jewellery making ===
The bright metallic green elytra of S. aequisignata are collected and used as a material in jewellery making.
