= List of Heleomyzidae genera =

This is a list of 82 genera in Heleomyzidae, a family of flies in the order Diptera.

== Heleomyzidae genera ==
- Aberdareleria Woznica, 1993^{c g}
- Acantholeria Garrett, 1921^{i c g}
- Allophylina Tonnoir & Malloch, 1927^{c g}
- Allophylopsis Lamb, 1909^{c g}
- Amoebaleria Garrett, 1921^{b}
- Amphidysis McAlpine, 1985^{c g}
- Anastomyza Malloch, 1927^{c g}
- Aneuria Malloch, 1930^{c g}
- Anorostoma Loew, 1862^{i c g b}
- Apophoneura Malloch, 1933^{c g}
- Austroleria McAlpine, 1985^{c g}
- Balticoleria Woznica, 2007^{g}
- Blaesochaetophora Czerny, 1904^{c g}
- Borboroides Malloch, 1925^{c g}
- Borboropsis Czerny, 1902^{i c g b}
- Cairnsimyia Malloch, 1931^{c g}
- Cephodapedon Malloch, 1933^{c g}
- Chaetohelomyza Hennig, 1965^{g}
- Cinderella Steyskal, 1949^{i c g b}
- Desertoleria Gorodkov, 1962^{c g}
- Diacia Wiedemann, 1830^{c g}
- Dichromya Robineau-Desvoidy, 1830^{c g}
- Dihoplopyga Malloch, 1933^{g}
- Dioche McAlpine, 1985^{c g}
- Diplogeomyza Hendel, 1917^{c g}
- Eccoptomera Loew, 1862^{i c g b}
- Electroleria Hennig, 1965^{g}
- Epistomyia Hendel, 1917^{c g}
- Fenwickia Malloch, 1930^{c g}
- Gephyromyza Malloch, 1933^{c g}
- Gymnomus Loew, 1863^{g}
- Heleomicra McAlpine, 1985^{c g}
- Heleomyza Fallén, 1810^{i c g b}
- Heteromyza Fallén, 1820^{i c g b}
- Kiboleria Lindner, 1956^{c g}
- Leriella Meunier, 1908^{g}
- Leriopsis McAlpine, 1967^{c g}
- Lutomyia Aldrich, 1922^{i c g}
- Mayomyia Malloch, 1934^{c g}
- Morpholeria Garrett, 1921^{i c g}
- Neoleria Malloch, 1919^{i c g b}
- Neorhinotora Lopes, 1934^{i c g}
- Neossos Malloch, 1927^{i c g}
- Nephellum McAlpine, 1985^{c g}
- Nidomyia Papp, 1998^{c g}
- Notomyza Malloch, 1933^{c g}
- Oecothea Haliday, 1837^{i c g b}
- Oldenbergiella Czerny, 1924^{i c g}
- Ollix McAlpine, 1985^{c g}
- Orbellia Robineau-Desvoidy, 1830^{i c g b}
- Paleoheleomyza Woznica & Palaczyk, 2005^{g}
- Paraneossos Wheeler, 1955^{i c g}
- Paratrixoscelis Soos, 1977^{c g}
- Pentachaeta McAlpine, 1985^{c g}
- Philotroctes Czerny, 1930^{c g}
- Porsenus Aldrich & Darlington, 1908^{i c g}
- Prosopantrum Enderlein, 1912^{c g}
- Protoorbellia Woznica, 2006^{g}
- Protosuillia Hennig, 1965^{g}
- Pseudoleria Garrett, 1921^{i c g}
- Psiloplagia Czerny, 1928^{c g}
- Rhinotora Schiner, 1868^{c g}
- Rhinotoroides Lopes, 1934^{c g}
- Schroederella Enderlein, 1920^{i c g b}
- Scoliocentra Loew, 1862^{i c g b}
- Spilochroa Williston, 1907^{i c g}
- Stuckenbergiella Cogan, 1971^{c g}
- Suillia Robineau-Desvoidy, 1830^{i c g b}
- Tapeigaster Macquart, 1847^{c g}
- Tephrochlaena Czerny, 1924^{c g}
- Tephrochlamys Loew, 1862^{i c g b}
- Trixoleria McAlpine, 1967^{c g}
- Trixoscelis Rondani, 1856^{i c g b}
- Waterhouseia Malloch, 1936^{c g}
- Woznicaia Koçak & Kemal, 2010^{g}
- Xeneura Malloch, 1930^{c g}
- Zachaetomyia Malloch, 1933^{c g}
- Zagonia Coquillett, 1904^{i c g}
- Zentula McAlpine, 1985^{c g}
- Zinza Sinclair & McAlpine, 1995^{c g}

Data sources: i = ITIS, c = Catalogue of Life, g = GBIF, b = Bugguide.net
