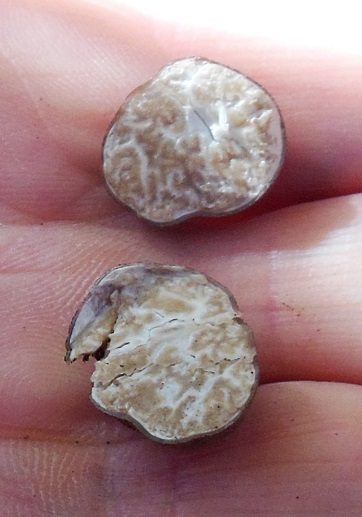
- Cross section of Tuber rufum truffle, showing gleba

Scientific classification
- Kingdom: Fungi
- Division: Ascomycota
- Class: Pezizomycetes
- Order: Pezizales
- Family: Tuberaceae
- Genus: Tuber
- Species: T. rufum

Binomial name
- Tuber rufum Pollini, 1816

= Tuber rufum =

Species of truffle

Tuber rufum, also known as the red truffle, is an ectomycorrhizal fungus widely distributed across Europe and found in association with many species of broadleaf and coniferous trees and commonly encountered as an accidental contaminant in commercial truffle-infected plants in areas with neutral to high pH soils. Tuber rufum may be commonly encountered in commercial truffle growing operations or while foraging, however, it is culinary unpopular with no commercial value.

== Description ==
The fruiting body (ascocarp) of Tuber rufum is a hypogeous, subglobose, or irregular sporocarp approximately 6–20 mm in diameter; reddish brown to yellowish brown, may be minutely warted with flattened and hardened pyramidal warts covering the peridium, although the fruiting body may be smooth, always solid to touch. The internal gleba is hard and solid rarely with air pockets, starting with white flesh that then become marbled with a dark-brown background interrupted by numerous thin and white branching veins as the ascocarp matures

Microscopically, asci (ascus) are described as saccate to globose containing 1-5 elliptical to subglobose ascospores ornamented with spines approximately 2-4 μm long, ellipsoid, translucent and faintly yellow-orange, asci and ascospores are similar in size and shape, spines often curved. Typically, the asci bear 3-4 ascospores. The peridium is 400-500 μm thick composed of agglutinated thick-walled hyphae and interwoven hyphae which are pseudoparenchymatous apically. Cells composing surface structure are subangular, with pigmentation

However, high variability within the species due to both macroscopic and microscopic characters and poor species boundaries have led to the description of new related species and the emergence of the Tuber rufum species complex with an estimated 43 species included, of which 18 have been described, half of which hail from North America. The aroma of the fruiting body has been described to be a strong and nauseating odor similar to "cinnamon or smoky bacon" or alternatively, like garlic

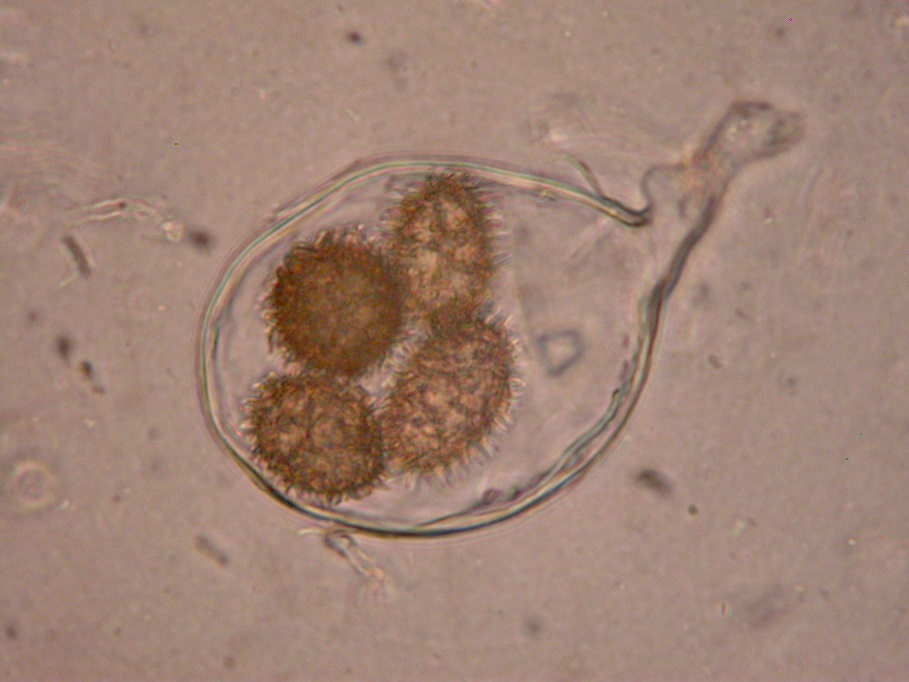
Tuber rufum ascospores

== Habitat ==
Tuber rufum is often encountered in the United Kingdom, France, and Italy but can be found throughout Europe. Hardwood forests predominated by species such as holm oak (Quercus ilex), beech (Fagus sylvatica), and conifers are often host to Tuber rufum which produce ascocarps in late summer and autumn in the Northern Hemisphere. While native to Europe, it has been introduced to temperate regions in the Southern Hemisphere, such as in the Patagonia region of Argentina as well as in North America and potentially as far as India.

Tuber species	Year	Region of Poland where Tuber fungi were collected from as reported by Rosa-Gruszecka et al. (2017).			
Tuber species	Year	Nida basin	Miechów upland	Przedbórz upland	Chełm hills
T. aestivum	2012	35		3	
T. aestivum	2013	125		166	
T. aestivum	2014	484		368	
T. excavatum	2012	236			
T. excavatum	2013	427			
T. excavatum	2014	291			17
T. rufum	2012	1			
T. rufum	2013				
T. rufum	2014				5
Total		1599		537	22

== Chemistry ==
A heteroglycan extracted from the ascocarps of T. rufum was found to trigger responses from human lymphocytes demonstrating an immune response. Volatile compounds isolated from Tuber differed in abundance ranging from the highest to lowest: alcohols, aldehydes, sulfides, and ketones. Volatile compounds which contribute to the aroma of the closely related truffle, Tuber melanosporum include 2-methyl-1-butanol, isoamyl alcohol, 2-methylbutyraldehyde, and 3-methylbutyraldehyde; positive identification of these compounds has been confirmed in Tuber rufum as well through the Headspace Solid Phase Microextraction-GC/MS (HS-SPME-GC/MS) system. The aroma of T. rufum may be subject to changes due to decomposition and freshness, with organoleptic values decreasing with colonization by yeasts, mold, and bacterial growth, degrading texture, aroma, and taste. Unique compounds to T. rufum as opposed to other truffle species analyzed by Strojnik et al. (2020) include: butanenitrile, 2-methyl- pentane, 2-nitro- butane, and 2-bromo-2-methyl were unique to T. rufum. It is suggested that 2-butanone is associated in truffle maturation in the genus Tuber

== Similar species ==
High variability in the Tuber rufum genome obscures species boundaries with related species such as T. huidongense on the basis of the β-tubulin gene sequence. European species in the T. rufum clade includes T. nitidum, T. panniferum, T. requienii, and the strains of T. rufum: var. apicleatum, brevisporum, lucidum, nigrum, oblongisporum and rutilum. American species belonging to the T. rufum clade include T. candidum and T. quercicola, and T. texense^{12}. Asian species of T. rufum include T. huidongense, T. liaotongense, and T. taiyuanense

== Taxonomy ==
The oldest description for Tuber rufum (Pico 1788) stems from Vittorio Pico. 18th century Turian physician and naturalist, however, current nomenclature sanctions T. rufum (Pollini, 1816) as the prioritized name. Synonyms for the species include Tuber cinereum (Tul. & C. Tul., 1845), Oogaster rufus (Pollini, 1854), T. lucidum (Vittad, 1884), T. lucidum (Bonnet, 1884), T. rufum f. lucidum (Montecchi & Lazzari, 1993), T. rufum var. brevisporum (Fisch, 1923), T. rufum var. oblongisporum (Fisch, 1923), T. rufum var. apiculatum (Fisch, 1923).

== Ecology ==
Tuber rufum is an ectomycorrhizal fungus present in temperate hardwood forests and in urban environments such as city parks and in polluted areas and associated with root matrices of holm oak (Quercus ilex), beech (Fagus sylvatica), and conifers in areas of neutral to high pH (5.5-7.5). In addition to aforementioned species, T. rufum forms ectomycorrhizal associations with hardwoods including Corylus avellana, Quercus robur, Q. cerris, Q. fraineto, Populus alba, P. nigra, Carpinus betulus, Betula pendula, Abies alba and the introduced Quercus boreali in the Balkan Peninsula.

Tuber rufum is known to associate with mycoviruses such as "Tuber rufum mitovirus 1" (TrMV1), however, its pathogenicity and hosts are unknown. Truffles such as Tuber rufum are dispersed by and consumed by humans and small animals such chipmunks, squirrels, rats, beetles, earwigs, flies, slugs, birds, and various insect larvae. Large animals that feed on truffles may include forest species such as deer, feral pigs, and boar. The truffle beetle, Leiodes cinnamomea is a specialist in the genus Tuber, damaging truffles and attracted to volatile compounds produced by truffles in early stage of growth, causing significant ecological damage. It is unknown whether they exploit Tuber rufum at this time. Beetles in the order Leiodidae are known to specialize in the consumption of forest fungus, consuming Tuber when available, and often feeding upon above-ground sources. Flies such as Suillia gigantea (Heleomyzidae) are well reported to feed on truffles in multiple life stages

Finally, the ephemeral resource provided by Tuber fungi attracts entomopathogenic nematodes such as Steinernema feltiae and S. carpocapsae which in turn feed on insects such as the European truffle beetle Leiodes cinnamomeus and Suillia maggots. Allomones emitted by Tuber fungi directly attract entomopathogenic nematodes at low concentrations such as 2-methylpropanol and 2-methyl-1-butanol implying an evolutionary symbiosis between Tuber fungi and entomopathogenic nematodes

== Reproduction ==
Little mention of the reproduction of Tuber rufum is reported from literature or from observation. However, inference from relatives, T. melanosporum and T. aestivum suggest that Tuber rufum ascospores engage in zoochory. Boars, feral pigs, and larvae of the truffle fly (Suilla tuberiperda) are which are laid upon and consume the truffle which mature into flies capable of wide dispersal aid in the dispersion of ingestion-tolerant spores which are excreted by animals, potentially at sites where ascospores may germinate near compatible ectomycorrhizal plant symbionts. The life history of T. rufum is largely unreported from literature. However, heterothallic reproduction has been reported from T. melanosporum and T. indicum therefore it may be possible for T. rufum to reproduce through heterothallic means as well. As of now, the mating-type locus of T. rufum has not been characterized, the ascocarp is composed of haploid hyphae with paternal DNA only present within ascospores in aforementioned cousin species.

== Consumption ==
While Tuber rufum is not traditionally known to be commercially harvested and sold for consumption, it is still edible and consumed by some truffle hunters. Unlike other species of truffle, T. rufum is not utilized to produce truffle products such as truffle oil, truffle butter, truffle caviar, truffle salt, or truffle sauce. According to those that have consumed T. rufum, its taste has been reported to be similar to cooked goat meat.
