= Suillia discolor =

Scientific classification
- Kingdom: Animalia
- Phylum: Arthropoda
- Class: Insecta
- Order: Diptera
- Family: Heleomyzidae
- Genus: Suillia
- Species: S. discolor

Binomial name
- Suillia discolor Czerny, 1927

Species of fly

Suillia discolor, is a European species of Heleomyzidae.
