= Suillia quadrilineata =

Scientific classification
- Kingdom: Animalia
- Phylum: Arthropoda
- Class: Insecta
- Order: Diptera
- Family: Heleomyzidae
- Genus: Suillia
- Species: S. quadrilineata

Binomial name
- Suillia quadrilineata Czerny, 1924

Species of fly

Suillia quadrilineata, is a European species of Heleomyzidae.
