= Suillia plumata =

Scientific classification
- Domain: Eukaryota
- Kingdom: Animalia
- Phylum: Arthropoda
- Class: Insecta
- Order: Diptera
- Family: Heleomyzidae
- Genus: Suillia
- Species: S. plumata

Binomial name
- Suillia plumata (Loew, 1862)

Synonyms
- Suillia chaetomera Czerny, 1849; Helomyza plumata Loew, 1862

Species of fly

Suillia plumata is a North American species of fly in the family Heleomyzidae.
