= Suillia villeneuvei =

Scientific classification
- Kingdom: Animalia
- Phylum: Arthropoda
- Class: Insecta
- Order: Diptera
- Family: Heleomyzidae
- Genus: Suillia
- Species: S. villeneuvei

Binomial name
- Suillia villeneuvei Czerny, 1924

Species of fly

Suillia villeneuvei is a European species of Heleomyzidae.
