= Suillia setitarsis =

Scientific classification
- Kingdom: Animalia
- Phylum: Arthropoda
- Class: Insecta
- Order: Diptera
- Family: Heleomyzidae
- Genus: Suillia
- Species: S. setitarsis

Binomial name
- Suillia setitarsis (Czerny, 1904)

Synonyms
- Helomyza setitarsis Czerny, 1904

Species of fly

Suillia setitarsis is a species of Heleomyzidae flies native to Europe.
