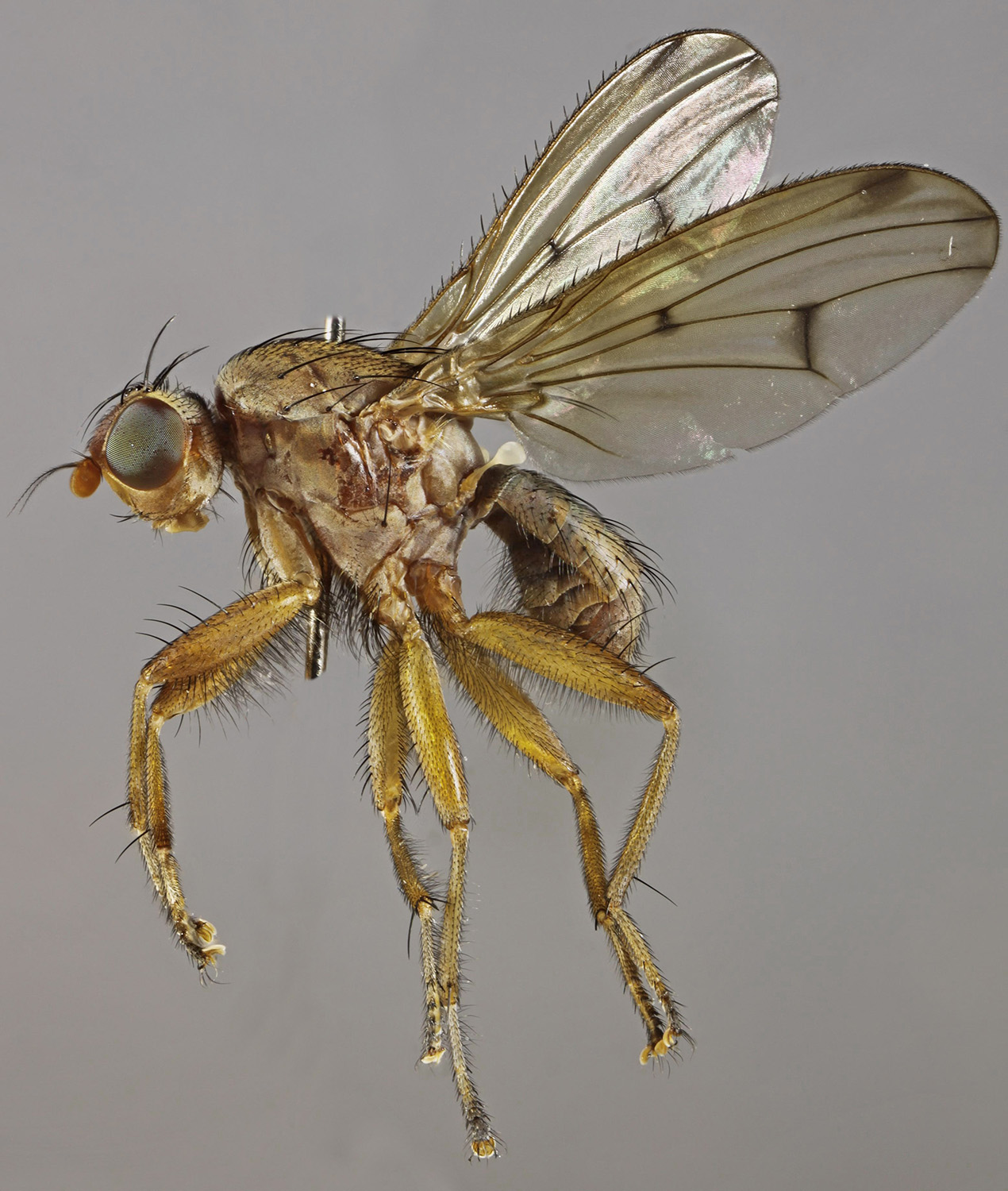
- Suillia imberbis North Wales

Scientific classification
- Kingdom: Animalia
- Phylum: Arthropoda
- Class: Insecta
- Order: Diptera
- Family: Heleomyzidae
- Genus: Suillia
- Species: S. imberbis

Binomial name
- Suillia imberbis Czerny, 1924

= Suillia imberbis =

Species of fly

Suillia imberbis is a Palearctic species of Heleomyzidae.
