= Suillia oldenbergii =

Scientific classification
- Kingdom: Animalia
- Phylum: Arthropoda
- Class: Insecta
- Order: Diptera
- Family: Heleomyzidae
- Genus: Suillia
- Species: S. oldenbergii

Binomial name
- Suillia oldenbergii (Czerny, 1904)

Synonyms
- Helomyza oldenbergii Czerny, 1904

Species of fly

Suillia oldenbergii, is a European species of Heleomyzidae.
