= Suillia flagripes =

Scientific classification
- Kingdom: Animalia
- Phylum: Arthropoda
- Class: Insecta
- Order: Diptera
- Family: Heleomyzidae
- Genus: Suillia
- Species: S. flagripes

Binomial name
- Suillia flagripes (Czerny, 1904)

Synonyms
- Helomyza flagripes Czerny, 1904

Species of fly

Suillia flagripes, is a European species of Heleomyzidae.
