= Suillia kroeberi =

Scientific classification
- Kingdom: Animalia
- Phylum: Arthropoda
- Class: Insecta
- Order: Diptera
- Family: Heleomyzidae
- Genus: Suillia
- Species: S. kroeberi

Binomial name
- Suillia kroeberi Czerny, 1935

Species of fly

Suillia kroeberi, is a European species of Heleomyzidae.
