= Suillia flava =

Scientific classification
- Kingdom: Animalia
- Phylum: Arthropoda
- Class: Insecta
- Order: Diptera
- Family: Heleomyzidae
- Genus: Suillia
- Species: S. flava

Binomial name
- Suillia flava (Meigen, 1830)

Synonyms
- Helomyza flava Meigen, 1830; Helomyza rufa Fallén, 1820; Suillia rufa (Fallén, 1820)

Species of fly

Suillia flava, is a European species of Heleomyzidae.
