= Suillia parva =

Scientific classification
- Kingdom: Animalia
- Phylum: Arthropoda
- Class: Insecta
- Order: Diptera
- Family: Heleomyzidae
- Genus: Suillia
- Species: S. parva

Binomial name
- Suillia parva (Loew, 1862)

Synonyms
- Helomyza parva Loew, 1862; Suillia collini Hackman, 1972; Suillia flavifrons (Collin, 1943)

Species of fly

Suillia parva, is a European species of Heleomyzidae.
