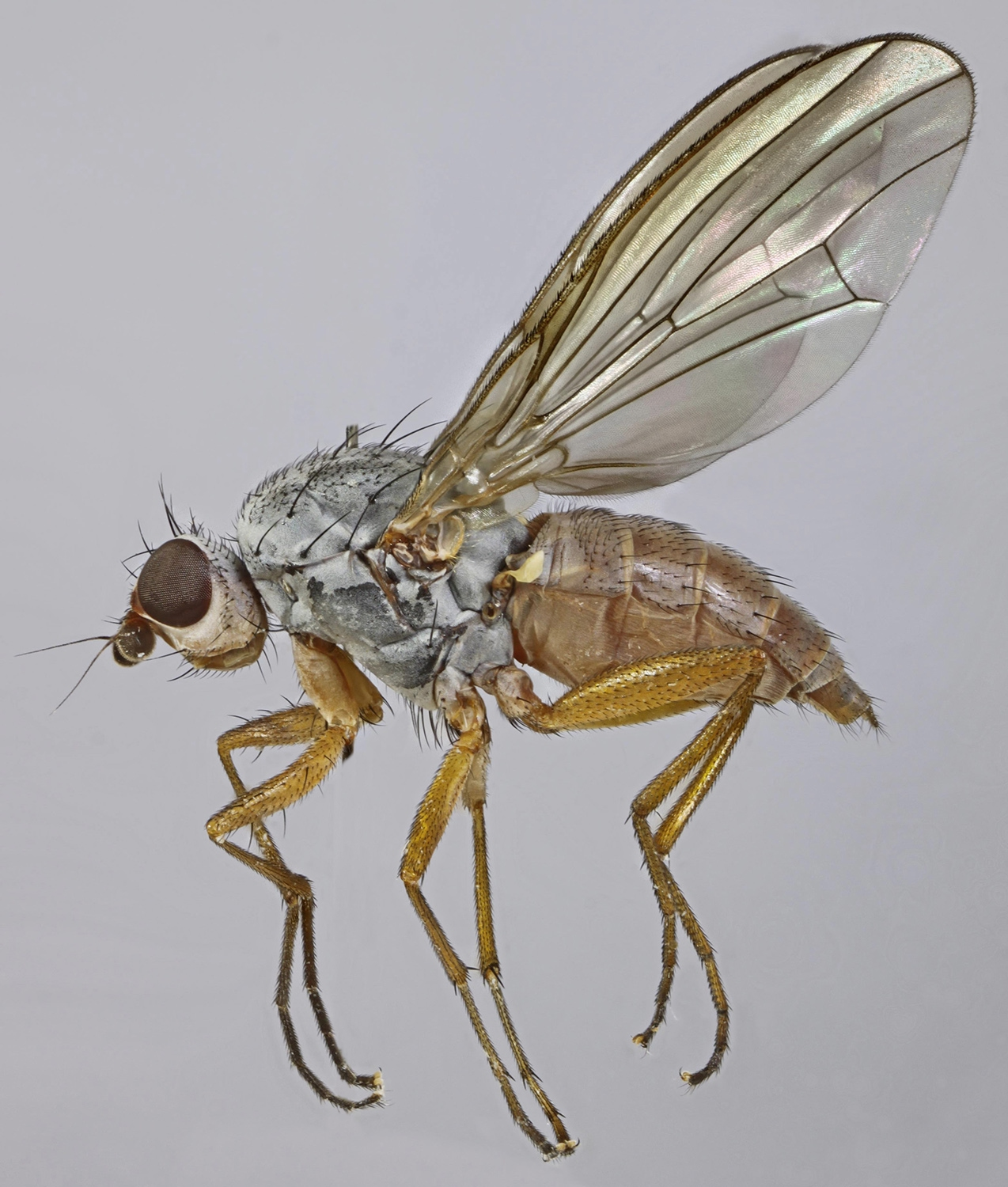
- Tephrochlamys rufiventris North Wales

Scientific classification
- Kingdom: Animalia
- Phylum: Arthropoda
- Clade: Pancrustacea
- Class: Insecta
- Order: Diptera
- Family: Heleomyzidae
- Genus: Tephrochlamys
- Species: T. rufiventris

Binomial name
- Tephrochlamys rufiventris (Meigen, 1830)

= Tephrochlamys rufiventris =

Species of fly

Tephrochlamys rufiventris is a species of fly in the family Heleomyzidae. It is found in the Palearctic. The body length is 5 to 6 mm. The head has both setae and bristles on the gena. The thorax is characterized by the presence of setae on the propleura, a bare prothorax and metathoracic setae in a 0+3 arrangement, with the first pair of suture setae lying closer to the suture than to the second pair. The posterior and anterior metathoracic setae are almost the same length, and the hairs between them are placed in more than four rows. The wings have short and monochromatic pterostigmas and spine-like bristles on the costal vein longer than the hair. The middle pair of legs has one well-developed spur on each tibia. For terms see Morphology of Diptera.

Content in this edit is translated from the existing Polish Wikipedia article at pl:Tephrochlamys rufiventris; see its history for attribution
