= Suillia hispanica =

Scientific classification
- Kingdom: Animalia
- Phylum: Arthropoda
- Class: Insecta
- Order: Diptera
- Family: Heleomyzidae
- Genus: Suillia
- Species: S. hispanica

Binomial name
- Suillia hispanica (Loew, 1862)

Synonyms
- Helomyza hispanica Loew, 1862

Species of fly

Suillia hispanica is a European species of Heleomyzidae.
