= Suillia innotata =

Scientific classification
- Kingdom: Animalia
- Phylum: Arthropoda
- Class: Insecta
- Order: Diptera
- Family: Heleomyzidae
- Genus: Suillia
- Species: S. innotata

Binomial name
- Suillia innotata (Becker, 1908)

Synonyms
- Helomyza innotata Becker, 1908

Species of fly

Suillia innotata, is a European species of Heleomyzidae.
