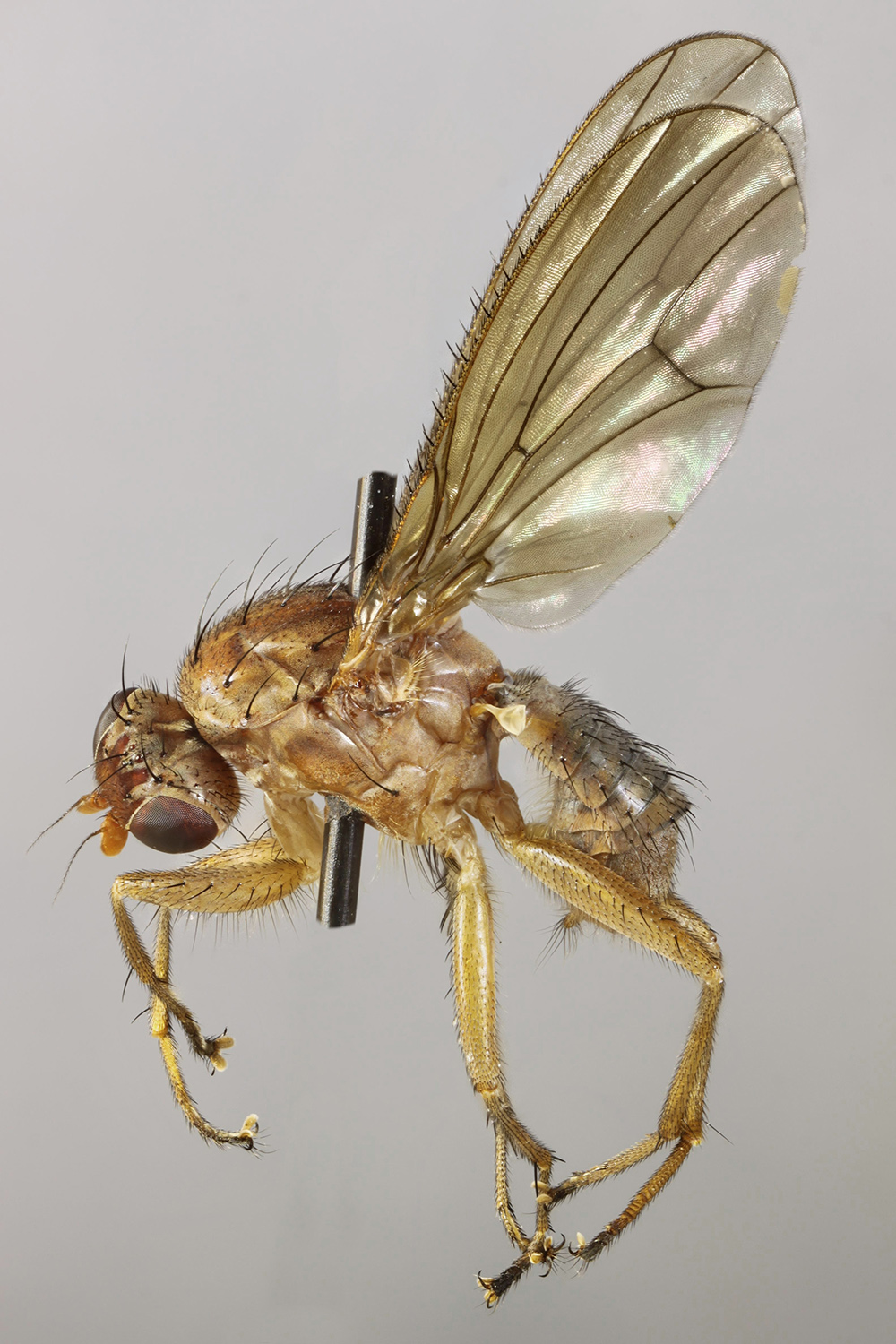
- Suillia bicolor North Wales

Scientific classification
- Kingdom: Animalia
- Phylum: Arthropoda
- Class: Insecta
- Order: Diptera
- Family: Heleomyzidae
- Genus: Suillia
- Species: S. bicolor

Binomial name
- Suillia bicolor (Zetterstedt, 1838)

Synonyms
- Helomyza zetterstedti Loew, 1862; Heteromyza bicolor Zetterstedt, 1838; Suillia zetterstedti (Loew, 1862)

= Suillia bicolor =

Species of fly

Suillia bicolor is a Palearctic species of Heleomyzidae. The sctellum is covered with light, fine, scattered hairs. The wing venation is characterized by the presence of small spines on the costal vein. The first pair of legs of the male has the first tarsal segments equipped with a spike of a triangular shape and a width smaller than the width of the segment. The female's abdomen has a seventh segment that is longer than the sixth. The reproductive organs of females have three irregularly jagged, cylindrical in outline, seminal receptacles narrowly curled at the apex. For terms see Morphology of Diptera.

Suillia bicolor is known from Spain, Andorra, Ireland, Great Britain, France, Belgium, the Netherlands, Germany, Denmark, Sweden, Norway, Finland, Switzerland, Austria, Italy, Poland, Estonia, Latvia, Lithuania, the Czech Republic, Slovakia, Hungary, Ukraine, Romania, Bulgaria, Russia, North Africa, the Middle East and the Eastern Palearctic

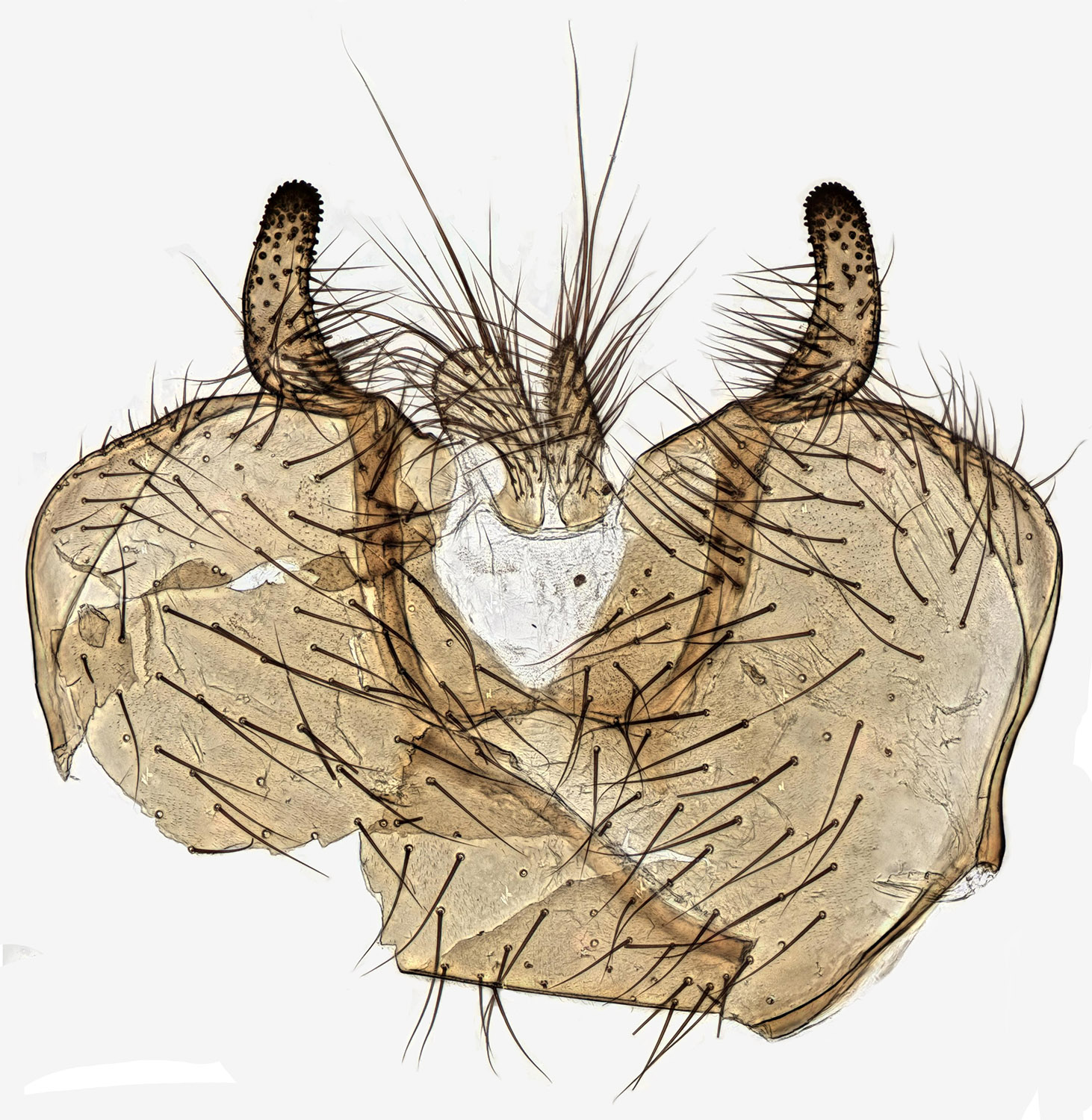

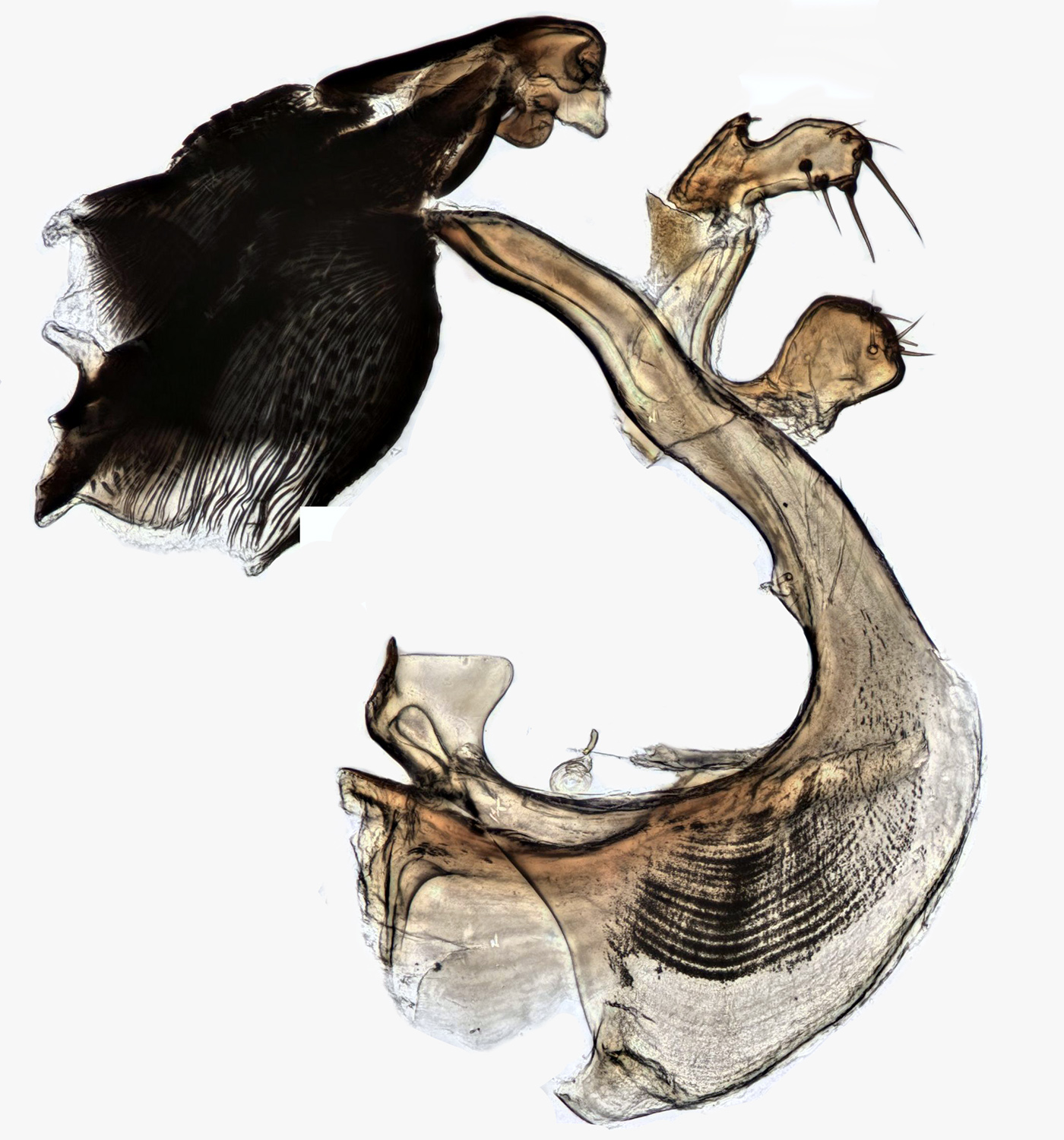
genitalia

Content in this edit is translated from the existing Polish Wikipedia article at pl:Suillia bicolor; see its history for attribution
