= Suillia ustulata =

Scientific classification
- Kingdom: Animalia
- Phylum: Arthropoda
- Class: Insecta
- Order: Diptera
- Family: Heleomyzidae
- Genus: Suillia
- Species: S. ustulata

Binomial name
- Suillia ustulata (Meigen, 1830)

Synonyms
- Helomyza ustulata Meigen, 1830

Species of fly

Suillia ustulata is a European species of Heleomyzidae.
