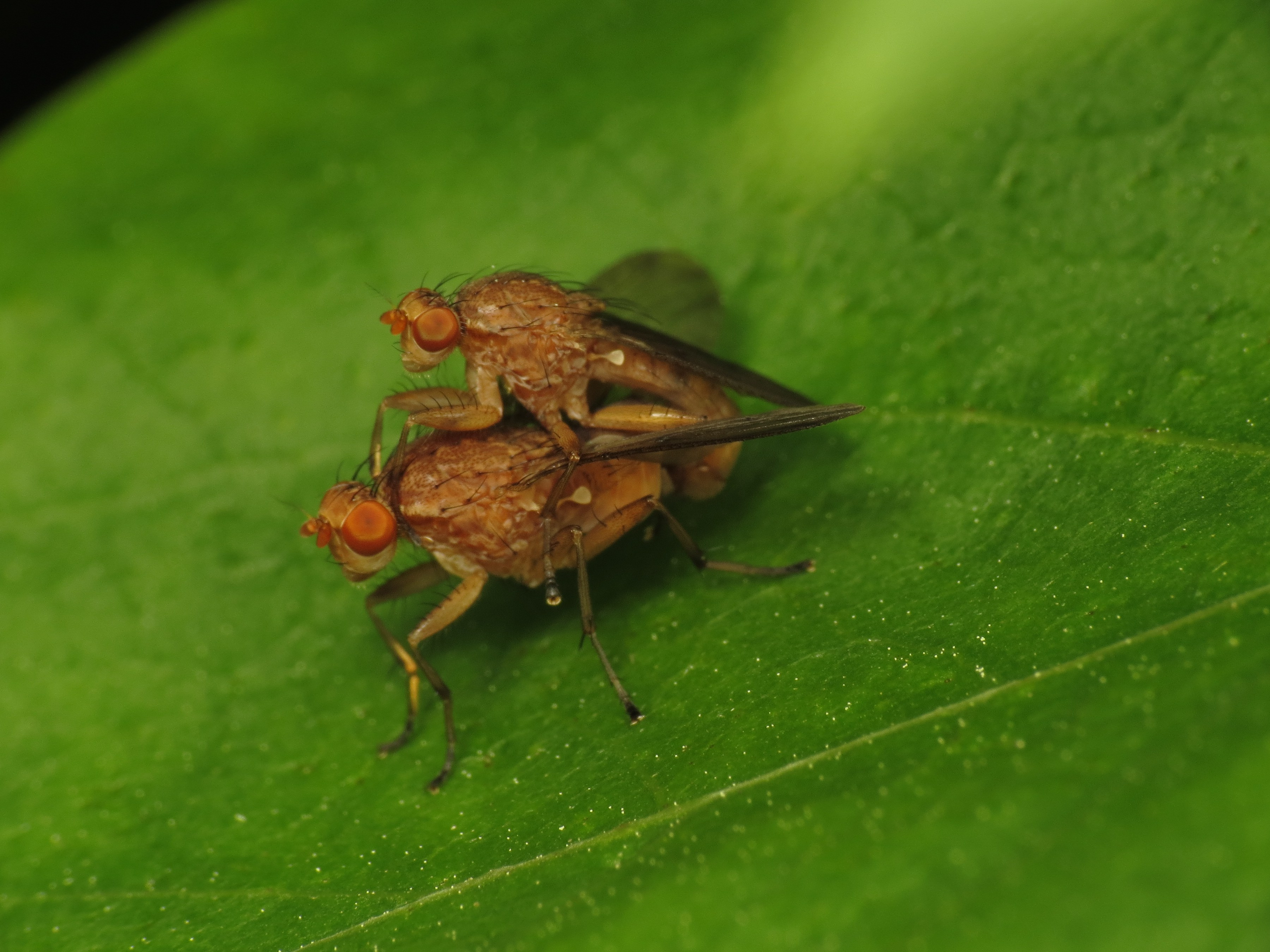

Scientific classification
- Kingdom: Animalia
- Phylum: Arthropoda
- Class: Insecta
- Order: Diptera
- Family: Heleomyzidae
- Genus: Suillia
- Species: S. pallida

Binomial name
- Suillia pallida (Fallén, 1820)

Synonyms
- Helomyza olens Meigen, 1830; Helomyza pallida Fallén, 1820; Suillia olens (Meigen, 1830)

= Suillia pallida =

Species of fly

Suillia pallida is a European species of Heleomyzidae.
