= Cinderella pollinosa =

Scientific classification
- Kingdom: Animalia
- Phylum: Arthropoda
- Clade: Pancrustacea
- Class: Insecta
- Order: Diptera
- Family: Heleomyzidae
- Genus: Cinderella
- Species: C. pollinosa

Binomial name
- Cinderella pollinosa Hennig, 1969

Species of fly

Cinderella pollinosa is a species of fly in the family Heleomyzidae.
