= Cinderella macalpinei =

Scientific classification
- Kingdom: Animalia
- Phylum: Arthropoda
- Clade: Pancrustacea
- Class: Insecta
- Order: Diptera
- Family: Heleomyzidae
- Genus: Cinderella
- Species: C. macalpinei

Binomial name
- Cinderella macalpinei Hennig, 1969

Species of fly

Cinderella macalpinei is a species of fly in the family Heleomyzidae.
