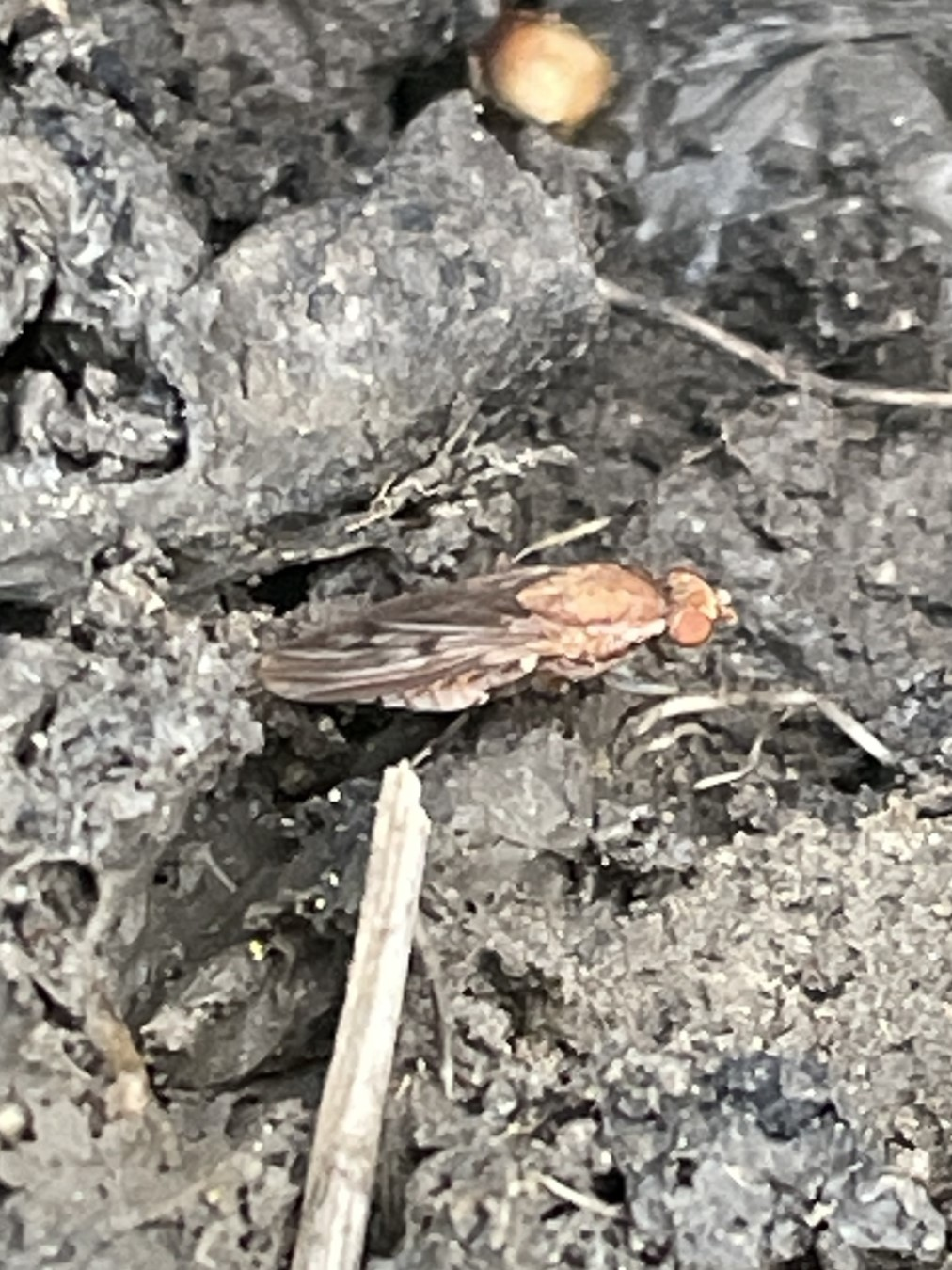

Scientific classification
- Kingdom: Animalia
- Phylum: Arthropoda
- Class: Insecta
- Order: Diptera
- Family: Heleomyzidae
- Genus: Suillia
- Species: S. barberi

Binomial name
- Suillia barberi (Darlington, 1908)

Synonyms
- Helomyza barberi Darlington, 1908

= Suillia barberi =

Species of fly

Suillia barberi is a species of fly in the family Heleomyzidae. Adults are 5.5–6 millimetres (0.22–0.24 in) in length and reddish to brown in color. It is found across the western United States and Canada.
