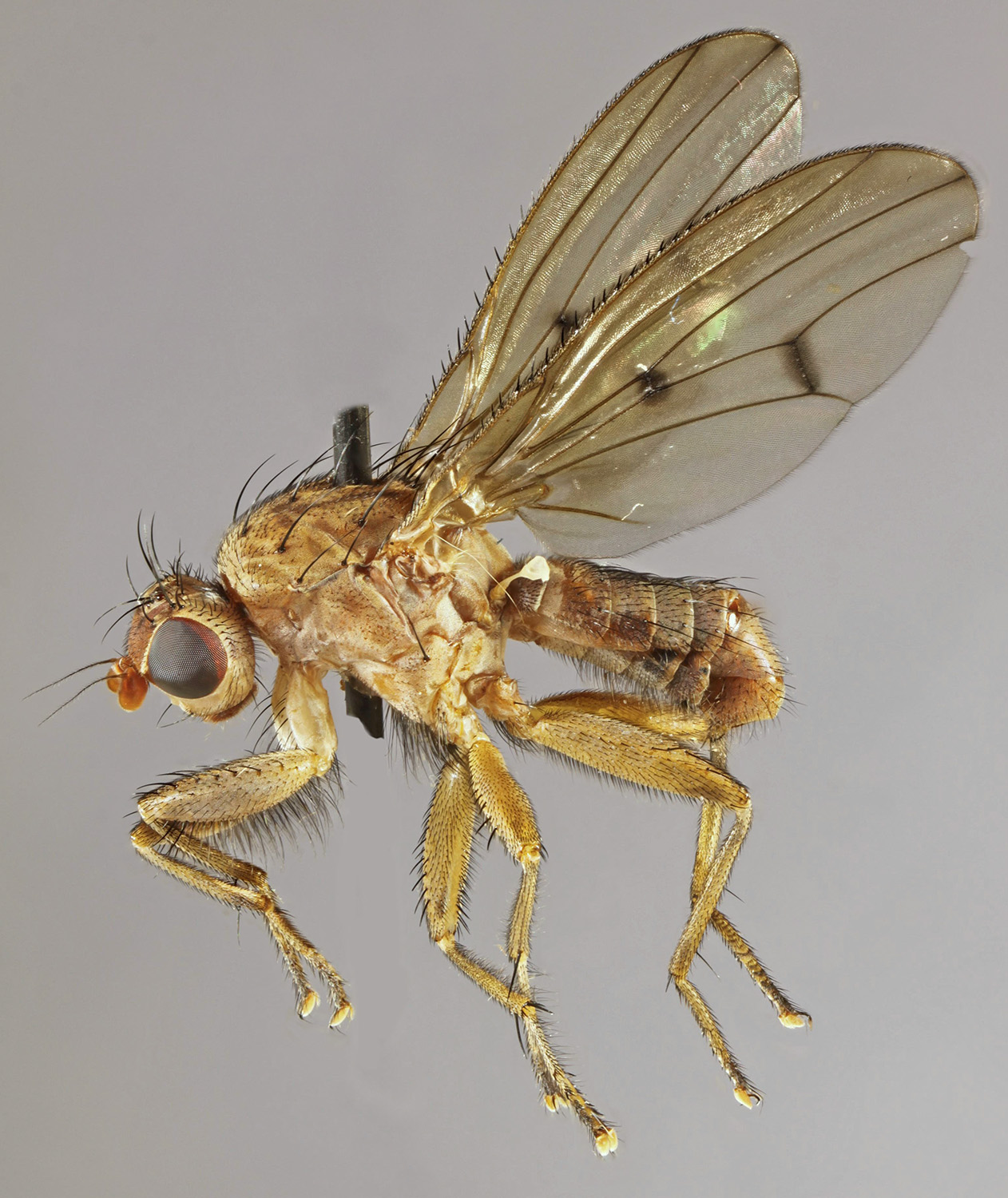
- Suillia humilis North Wales

Scientific classification
- Kingdom: Animalia
- Phylum: Arthropoda
- Class: Insecta
- Order: Diptera
- Family: Heleomyzidae
- Genus: Suillia
- Species: S. humilis

Binomial name
- Suillia humilis (Meigen, 1830)

Synonyms
- Helomyza humilis Meigen, 1830; Helomyza inornata Loew, 1862; Suillia inornata (Loew, 1862)

= Suillia humilis =

Species of fly

Suillia humilis, is a European species of Heleomyzidae.
