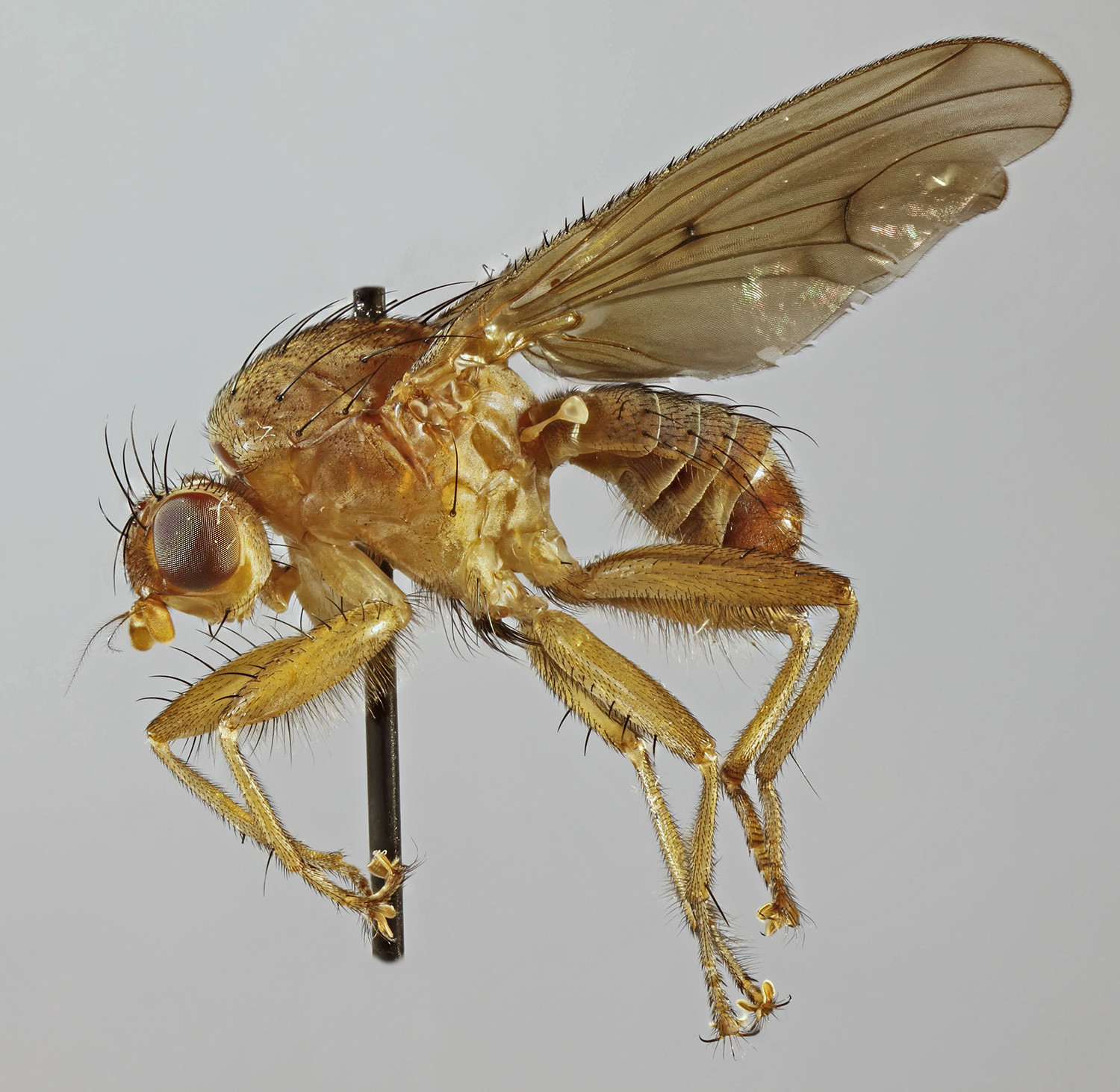

Scientific classification
- Kingdom: Animalia
- Phylum: Arthropoda
- Class: Insecta
- Order: Diptera
- Family: Heleomyzidae
- Genus: Suillia
- Species: S. notata

Binomial name
- Suillia notata (Meigen, 1830)

Synonyms
- Helomyza hilaris Zetterstedt, 1847; Helomyza notata Meigen, 1830; Helomyza pectoralis Loew, 1862; Suillia hilaris (Zetterstedt, 1847); Suillia pectoralis (Loew, 1862)

= Suillia notata =

Species of fly

Suillia notata, is a European species of Heleomyzidae.
