= Suillia oceana =

Scientific classification
- Kingdom: Animalia
- Phylum: Arthropoda
- Class: Insecta
- Order: Diptera
- Family: Heleomyzidae
- Genus: Suillia
- Species: S. oceana

Binomial name
- Suillia oceana (Becker, 1908)

Synonyms
- Helomyza oceana Becker, 1908

Species of fly

Suillia oceana, is a European species of Heleomyzidae.
