= Neossos nidicola =

Scientific classification
- Kingdom: Animalia
- Phylum: Arthropoda
- Class: Insecta
- Order: Diptera
- Family: Heleomyzidae
- Genus: Neossos
- Species: N. nidicola

Binomial name
- Neossos nidicola (Frey, 1930)

Synonyms
- Ornitholeria nidicola Frey, 1930

Species of fly

Neossos nidicola, is a European species of Heleomyzidae.
