= Suillia dumicola =

Scientific classification
- Kingdom: Animalia
- Phylum: Arthropoda
- Clade: Pancrustacea
- Class: Insecta
- Order: Diptera
- Family: Heleomyzidae
- Genus: Suillia
- Species: S. dumicola

Binomial name
- Suillia dumicola (Collin, 1943)

Synonyms
- Helomyza dumicola Collin, 1943

Species of fly

Suillia dumicola is a European species of Heleomyzidae.
