= Suillia mikii =

Scientific classification
- Kingdom: Animalia
- Phylum: Arthropoda
- Class: Insecta
- Order: Diptera
- Family: Heleomyzidae
- Genus: Suillia
- Species: S. mikii

Binomial name
- Suillia mikii (Pokorny, 1886)

Synonyms
- Helomyza mikii Pokorny, 1886

Species of fly

Suillia mikii is a European fly species of the family Heleomyzidae.
