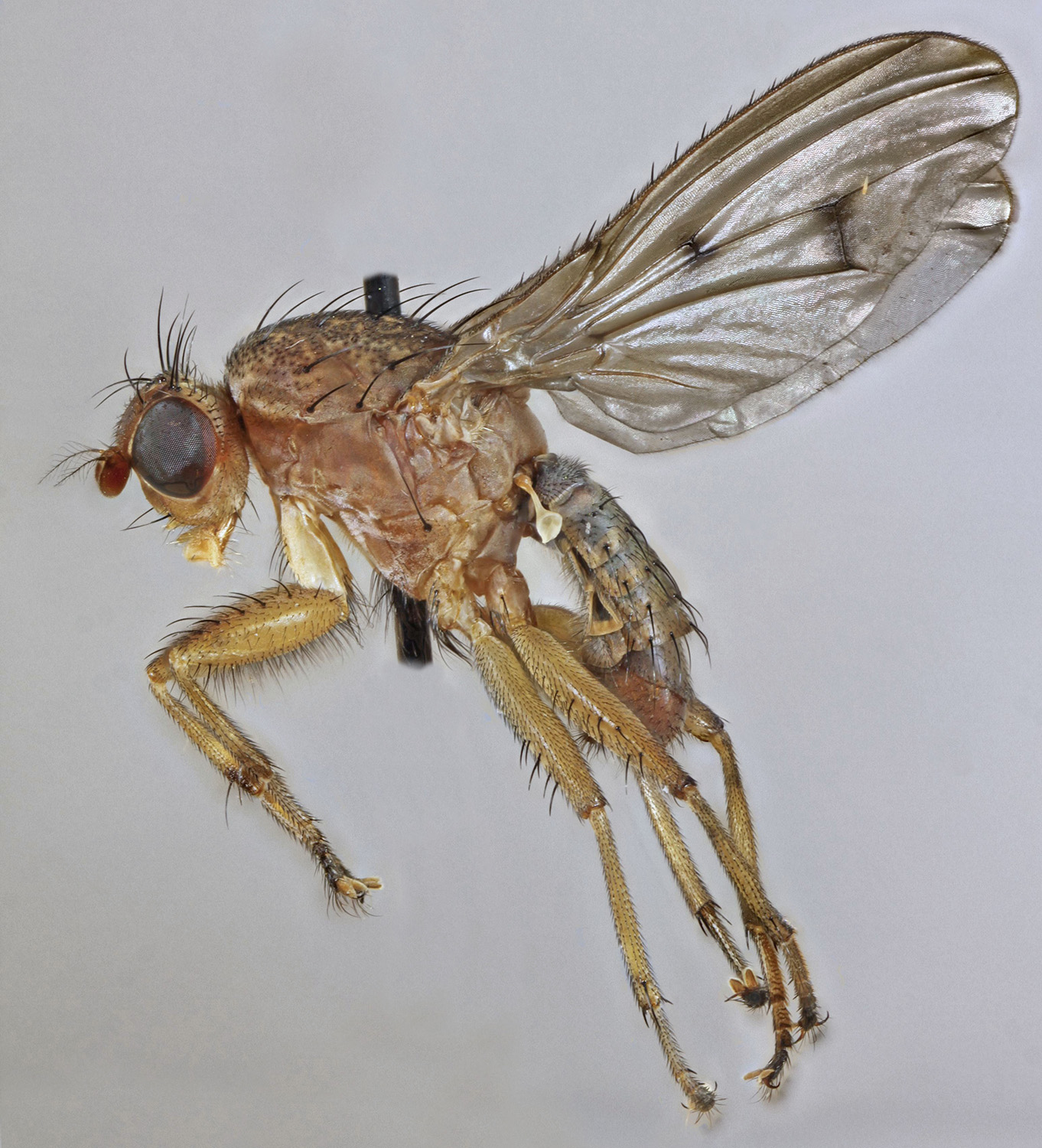
- Suillia affinis North Wales

Scientific classification
- Kingdom: Animalia
- Phylum: Arthropoda
- Class: Insecta
- Order: Diptera
- Family: Heleomyzidae
- Genus: Suillia
- Species: S. affinis

Binomial name
- Suillia affinis (Meigen, 1830)

Synonyms
- Helomyza affinis Meigen, 1830

= Suillia affinis =

Species of fly

Suillia affinis is a species of fly in the family Heleomyzidae. It is found in the Palearctic.
