= Suillia igori =

Scientific classification
- Kingdom: Animalia
- Phylum: Arthropoda
- Class: Insecta
- Order: Diptera
- Family: Heleomyzidae
- Genus: Suillia
- Species: S. igori

Binomial name
- Suillia igori Martinek, 1985

Species of fly

Suillia igori, is a European species of Heleomyzidae.
