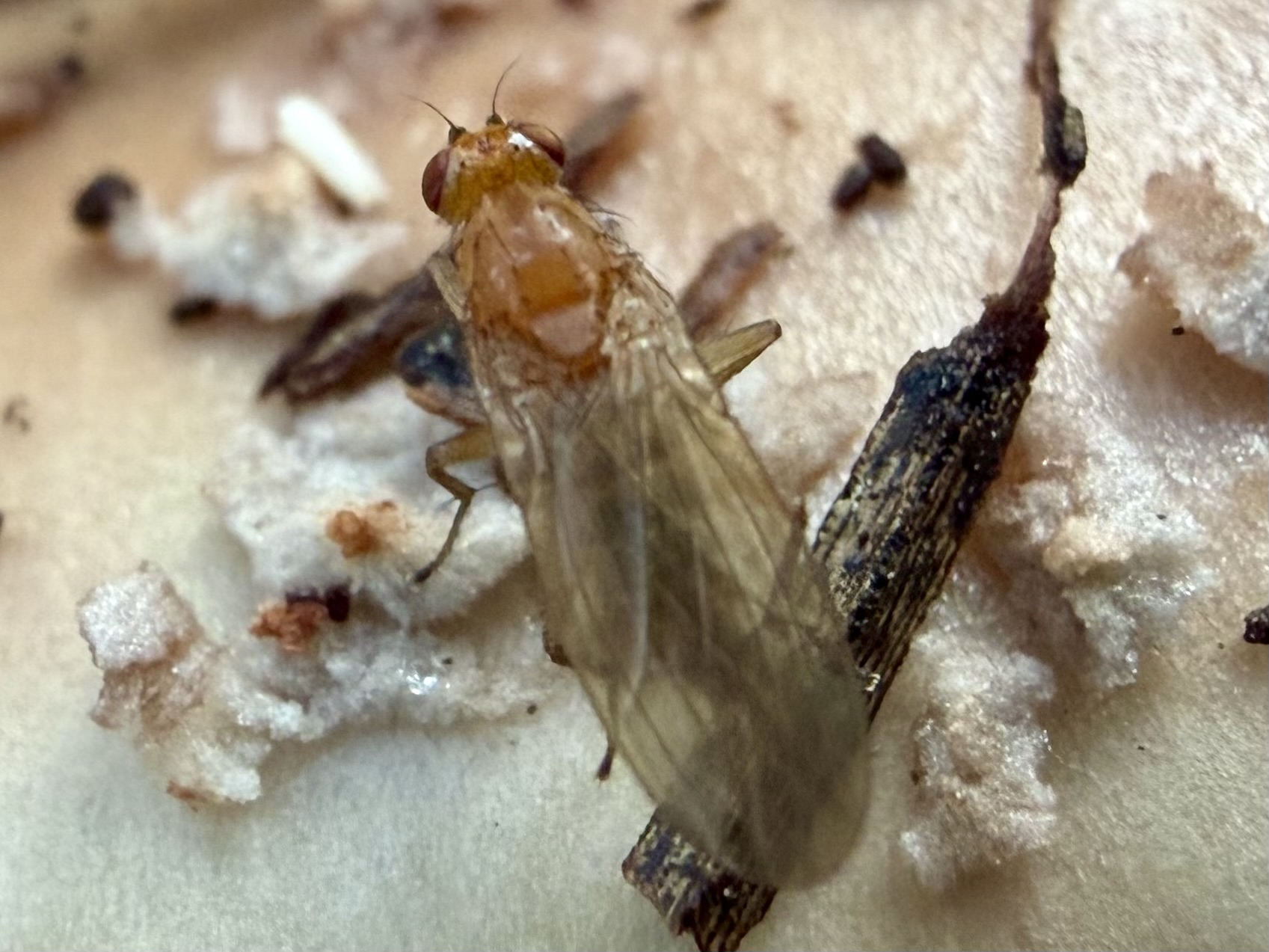
- Suillia atricornis, Wales, UK

Scientific classification
- Kingdom: Animalia
- Phylum: Arthropoda
- Clade: Pancrustacea
- Class: Insecta
- Order: Diptera
- Family: Heleomyzidae
- Genus: Suillia
- Species: S. atricornis

Binomial name
- Suillia atricornis (Meigen, 1830)

Synonyms
- Helomyza atricornis Meigen, 1830; Allophyla atricornis Meigen, 1830

= Suillia atricornis =

Species of fly

Suillia atricornis is a European species of true fly in the family Heleomyzidae. S. atricornis is native in both Europe and Canada.
