= Suillia lineitergum =

Scientific classification
- Kingdom: Animalia
- Phylum: Arthropoda
- Class: Insecta
- Order: Diptera
- Family: Heleomyzidae
- Genus: Suillia
- Species: S. lineitergum

Binomial name
- Suillia lineitergum (Pandellé, 1901)

Synonyms
- Helomyza lineitergum Pandellé, 1901

Species of fly

Suillia lineitergum, is a European species of Heleomyzidae.
