= Suillia flavitarsis =

Scientific classification
- Kingdom: Animalia
- Phylum: Arthropoda
- Class: Insecta
- Order: Diptera
- Family: Heleomyzidae
- Genus: Suillia
- Species: S. flavitarsis

Binomial name
- Suillia flavitarsis (Rondani, 1867)

Synonyms
- Helomyza flavitarsis Rondani, 1867

Species of fly

Suillia flavitarsis is a European species of Heleomyzidae.
