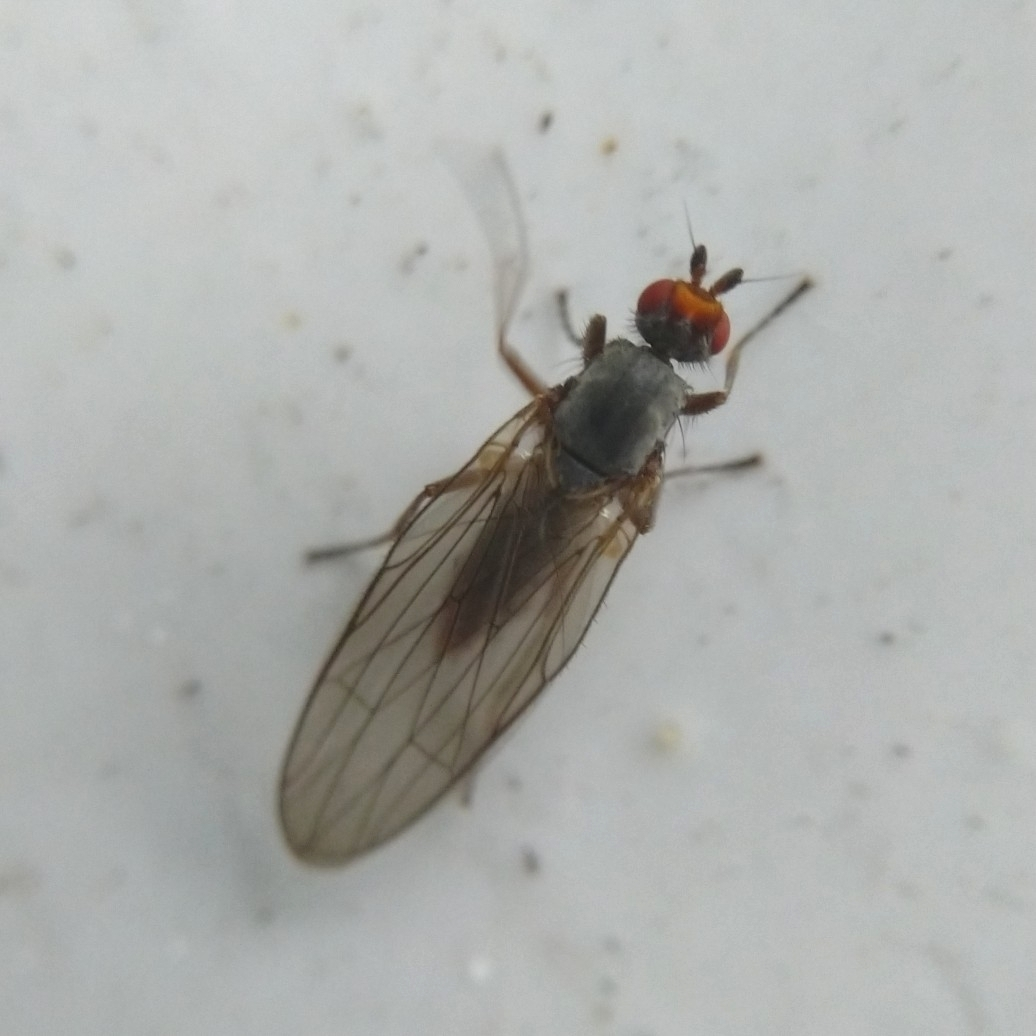
- Orbellia nivicola

Scientific classification
- Kingdom: Animalia
- Phylum: Arthropoda
- Class: Insecta
- Order: Diptera
- Family: Heleomyzidae
- Subfamily: Heleomyzinae
- Genus: Orbellia; Robineau-Desvoidy, 1830

= Orbellia =

Genus of flies

Orbellia is a genus of flies in the family Heleomyzidae. There are about 13 described species in Orbellia.

== Species ==
These 13 species belong to the genus Orbellia:

- O. amurensis Gorodkov, 1972^{c g}
- O. barbata (Garrett, 1921)^{i c g b}
- O. borisregis Czerny, 1930^{c g}
- O. cuniculorum (Robineau-Desvoidy, 1830)^{c g}
- O. hiemalis (Loew, 1862)^{i c g}
- O. montana Gorodkov, 1972^{c g}
- O. myiopiformis Robineau-Desvoidy, 1830^{c g}
- O. nivicola (Frey, 1913)^{c g}
- O. obscura Gorodkov, 1972^{c g}
- O. petersoni (Malloch, 1916)^{i c g b}
- O. tetrachaeta Gorodkov, 1972^{c g}
- O. tokyoensis Czerny, 1937^{c g}
- O. zaitzevi Gorodkov, 1972^{c g}

Data sources: i = ITIS, c = Catalogue of Life, g = GBIF, b = Bugguide.net
