= Oecothea specus =

Scientific classification
- Domain: Eukaryota
- Kingdom: Animalia
- Phylum: Arthropoda
- Class: Insecta
- Order: Diptera
- Family: Heleomyzidae
- Genus: Oecothea
- Species: O. specus

Binomial name
- Oecothea specus (Aldrich, 1897)

Synonyms
- Aecothea canadensis Garrett, 1921; Blepharoptera specus Aldrich, 1897

Species of fly

Oecothea specus is a species of fly in the family Heleomyzidae.
