= Suillia nemorum =

Scientific classification
- Kingdom: Animalia
- Phylum: Arthropoda
- Class: Insecta
- Order: Diptera
- Family: Heleomyzidae
- Genus: Suillia
- Species: S. nemorum

Binomial name
- Suillia nemorum (Meigen, 1830)

Synonyms
- Helomyza nemorum Meigen, 1830

Species of fly

Suillia nemorum, is a European species of Heleomyzidae.
