= Suillia pilimana =

Scientific classification
- Kingdom: Animalia
- Phylum: Arthropoda
- Class: Insecta
- Order: Diptera
- Family: Heleomyzidae
- Genus: Suillia
- Species: S. pilimana

Binomial name
- Suillia pilimana (Loew, 1862)

Synonyms
- Helomyza pilimana Loew, 1862

Species of fly

Suillia pilimana, is a European species of Heleomyzidae.
