= Suillia lurida =

Scientific classification
- Kingdom: Animalia
- Phylum: Arthropoda
- Clade: Pancrustacea
- Class: Insecta
- Order: Diptera
- Family: Heleomyzidae
- Genus: Suillia
- Species: S. lurida

Binomial name
- Suillia lurida (Meigen, 1830)

Synonyms
- Helomyza lurida Meigen, 1830

Species of fly

Suillia lurida, is a European species of Heleomyzidae.

The larvae feed on onion and garlic plants, where their feeding can damage the central leaves and interfere with the formation of bulbs or cloves.
