= Suillia convergens =

Scientific classification
- Kingdom: Animalia
- Phylum: Arthropoda
- Class: Insecta
- Order: Diptera
- Family: Heleomyzidae
- Genus: Suillia
- Species: S. convergens

Binomial name
- Suillia convergens (Walker, 1849, 1849)

Synonyms
- Dryomyza convergens Walker, 1849, 1849; Suillia loewi Garrett, 1925

Species of fly

Suillia convergens is a species of fly in the family Heleomyzidae.
