= Suillia apicalis =

Scientific classification
- Kingdom: Animalia
- Phylum: Arthropoda
- Class: Insecta
- Order: Diptera
- Family: Heleomyzidae
- Genus: Suillia
- Species: S. apicalis

Binomial name
- Suillia apicalis (Loew, 1862)

Synonyms
- Helomyza apicalis Loew, 1862

Species of fly

Suillia apicalis, is a European species of Heleomyzidae.
