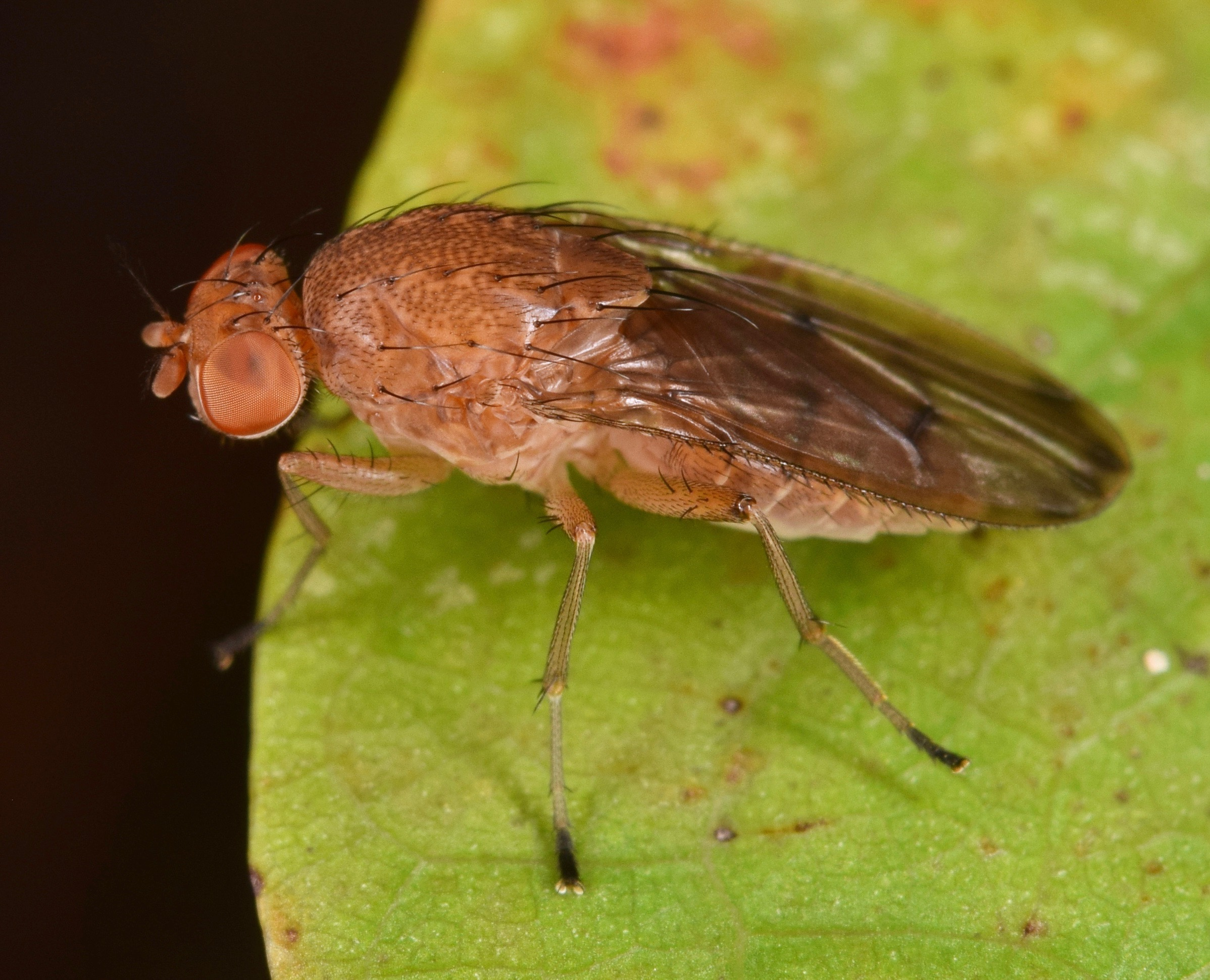

Scientific classification
- Domain: Eukaryota
- Kingdom: Animalia
- Phylum: Arthropoda
- Class: Insecta
- Order: Diptera
- Family: Heleomyzidae
- Genus: Suillia
- Species: S. quinquepunctata

Binomial name
- Suillia quinquepunctata (Say, 1823)

Synonyms
- Helomyza latericia Loew, 1862; Helomyza quinquepunctata Say, 1823

= Suillia quinquepunctata =

Species of fly

Suillia quinquepunctata is a species of fly in the family Heleomyzidae.
