= Suillia oxyphora =

Scientific classification
- Kingdom: Animalia
- Phylum: Arthropoda
- Class: Insecta
- Order: Diptera
- Family: Heleomyzidae
- Genus: Suillia
- Species: S. oxyphora

Binomial name
- Suillia oxyphora (Mik, 1900)

Synonyms
- Helomyza oxyphora Mik, 1900

Species of fly

Suillia oxyphora, is a European species of Heleomyzidae.
