= Suillia similis =

Scientific classification
- Kingdom: Animalia
- Phylum: Arthropoda
- Class: Insecta
- Order: Diptera
- Family: Heleomyzidae
- Genus: Suillia
- Species: S. similis

Binomial name
- Suillia similis (Meigen, 1838)

Synonyms
- Helomyza similis Meigen, 1838

Species of fly

Suillia similis, is a European species of Heleomyzidae.
