= Orbellia petersoni =

Scientific classification
- Domain: Eukaryota
- Kingdom: Animalia
- Phylum: Arthropoda
- Class: Insecta
- Order: Diptera
- Family: Heleomyzidae
- Genus: Orbellia
- Species: O. petersoni

Binomial name
- Orbellia petersoni (Malloch, 1916)

Synonyms
- Anarostomoides petersoni Malloch, 1916

Species of fly

Orbellia petersoni is a species of fly in the family Heleomyzidae.
