= Suillia laevifrons =

Scientific classification
- Kingdom: Animalia
- Phylum: Arthropoda
- Class: Insecta
- Order: Diptera
- Family: Heleomyzidae
- Genus: Suillia
- Species: S. laevifrons

Binomial name
- Suillia laevifrons (Loew, 1862)

Synonyms
- Helomyza laevifrons Loew, 1862; Helomyza rufa Fallén, 1820; Suillia rufa (Fallén, 1820)

Species of fly

Suillia laevifrons, is a European species of Heleomyzidae.
