= Cinderella aczeli =

Scientific classification
- Domain: Eukaryota
- Kingdom: Animalia
- Phylum: Arthropoda
- Class: Insecta
- Order: Diptera
- Family: Heleomyzidae
- Genus: Cinderella
- Species: C. aczeli

Binomial name
- Cinderella aczeli Steyskal, 1969

Species of fly

Cinderella aczeli is a species of fly in the family Heleomyzidae.
