= Suillia dawnae =

Scientific classification
- Kingdom: Animalia
- Phylum: Arthropoda
- Class: Insecta
- Order: Diptera
- Family: Heleomyzidae
- Genus: Suillia
- Species: S. dawnae

Binomial name
- Suillia dawnae Withers, 1987

Species of fly

Suillia dawnae, is a European species of Heleomyzidae.
