= Suillia bistrigata =

Scientific classification
- Kingdom: Animalia
- Phylum: Arthropoda
- Class: Insecta
- Order: Diptera
- Family: Heleomyzidae
- Genus: Suillia
- Species: S. bistrigata

Binomial name
- Suillia bistrigata (Meigen, 1830)

Synonyms
- Helomyza bistrigata Meigen, 1830

Species of fly

Suillia bistrigata, is a European species of Heleomyzidae.
