= Suillia univittata =

Scientific classification
- Kingdom: Animalia
- Phylum: Arthropoda
- Class: Insecta
- Order: Diptera
- Family: Heleomyzidae
- Genus: Suillia
- Species: S. univittata

Binomial name
- Suillia univittata (von Roser, 1840)

Synonyms
- Helomyza univittata von Roser, 1840

Species of fly

Suillia univittata is a European species of Heleomyzidae.
