= Suillia umbratica =

Scientific classification
- Kingdom: Animalia
- Phylum: Arthropoda
- Class: Insecta
- Order: Diptera
- Family: Heleomyzidae
- Genus: Suillia
- Species: S. umbratica

Binomial name
- Suillia umbratica (Meigen, 1835)

Synonyms
- Helomyza umbratica Meigen, 1835

Species of fly

Suillia umbratica is a European species of Heleomyzidae.
