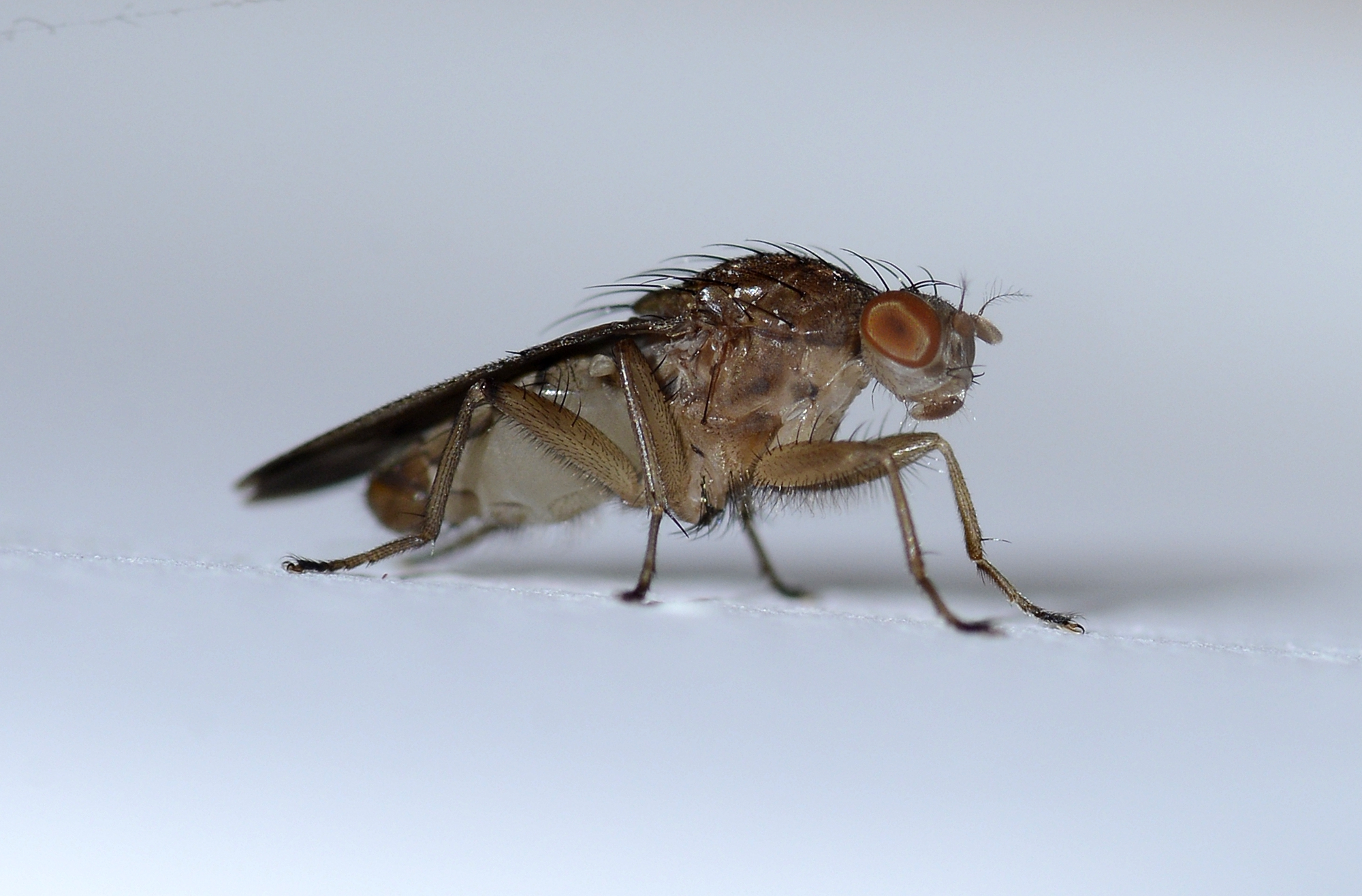
- Suillia variegata (male)

Scientific classification
- Kingdom: Animalia
- Phylum: Arthropoda
- Class: Insecta
- Order: Diptera
- Family: Heleomyzidae
- Genus: Suillia
- Species: S. variegata

Binomial name
- Suillia variegata (Loew, 1862)

Synonyms
- Helomyza variegata Loew, 1862; Suillia fungorum Robineau-Desvoidy, 1830

= Suillia variegata =

Species of fly

Suillia variegata is a Palearctic species of Heleomyzidae.

female sucking honeydew (video)

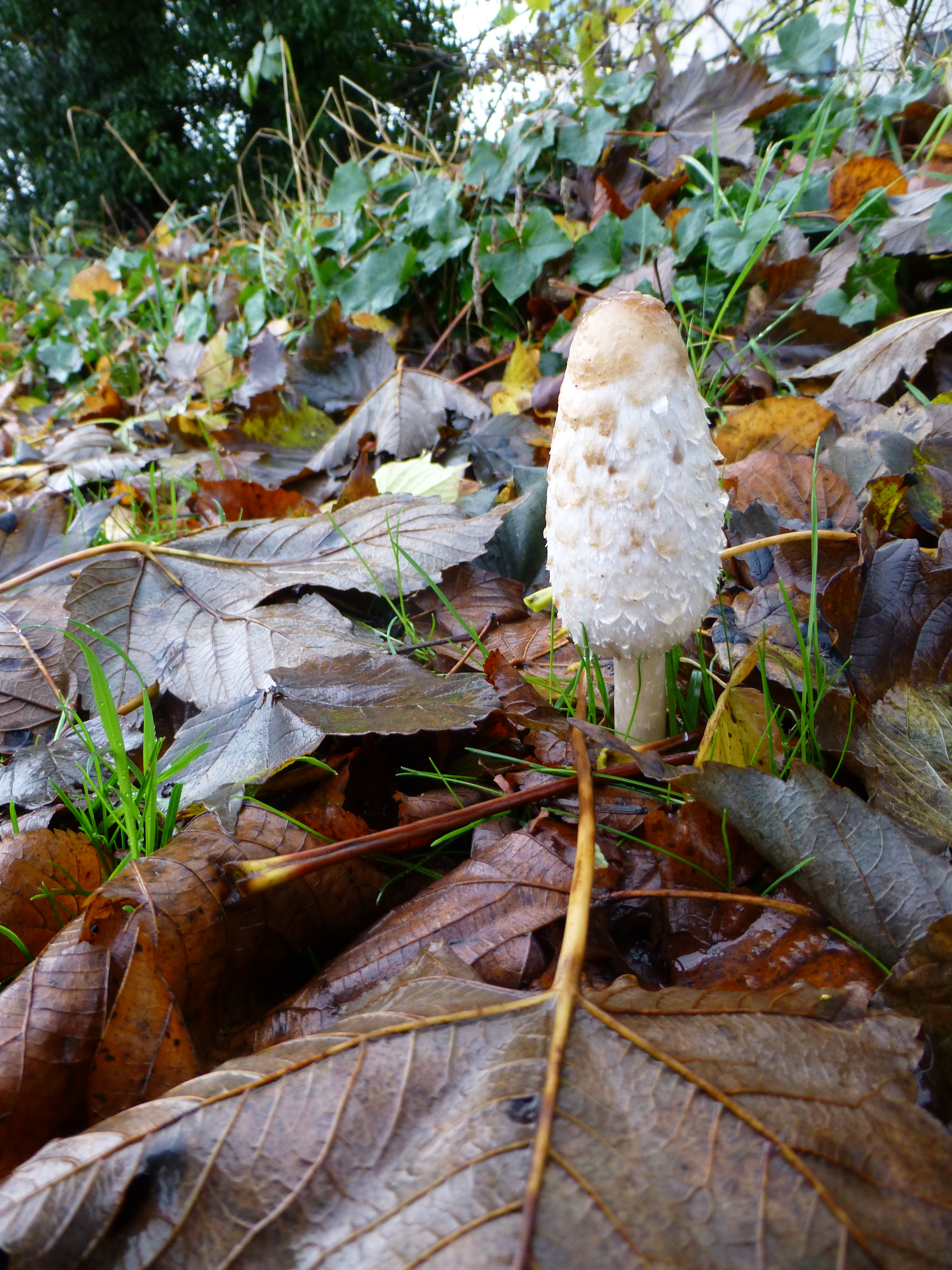
Habitat.Ireland.
