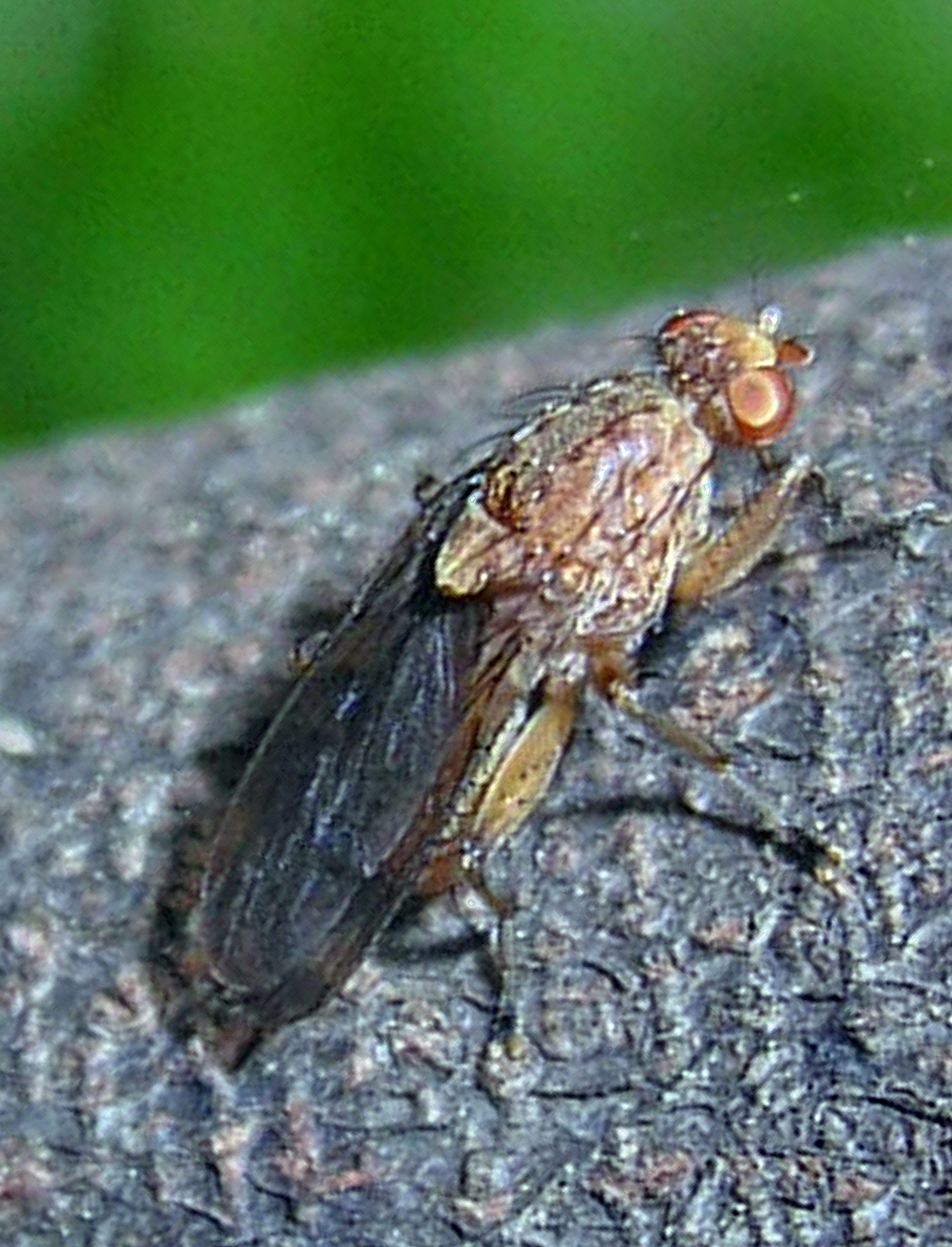

Scientific classification
- Kingdom: Animalia
- Phylum: Arthropoda
- Class: Insecta
- Order: Diptera
- Family: Heleomyzidae
- Genus: Suillia
- Species: S. fuscicornis

Binomial name
- Suillia fuscicornis (Zetterstedt, 1847)

Synonyms
- Helomyza fuscicornis Zetterstedt, 1847

= Suillia fuscicornis =

Species of fly

Suillia fuscicornis is a European species of Heleomyzidae.
