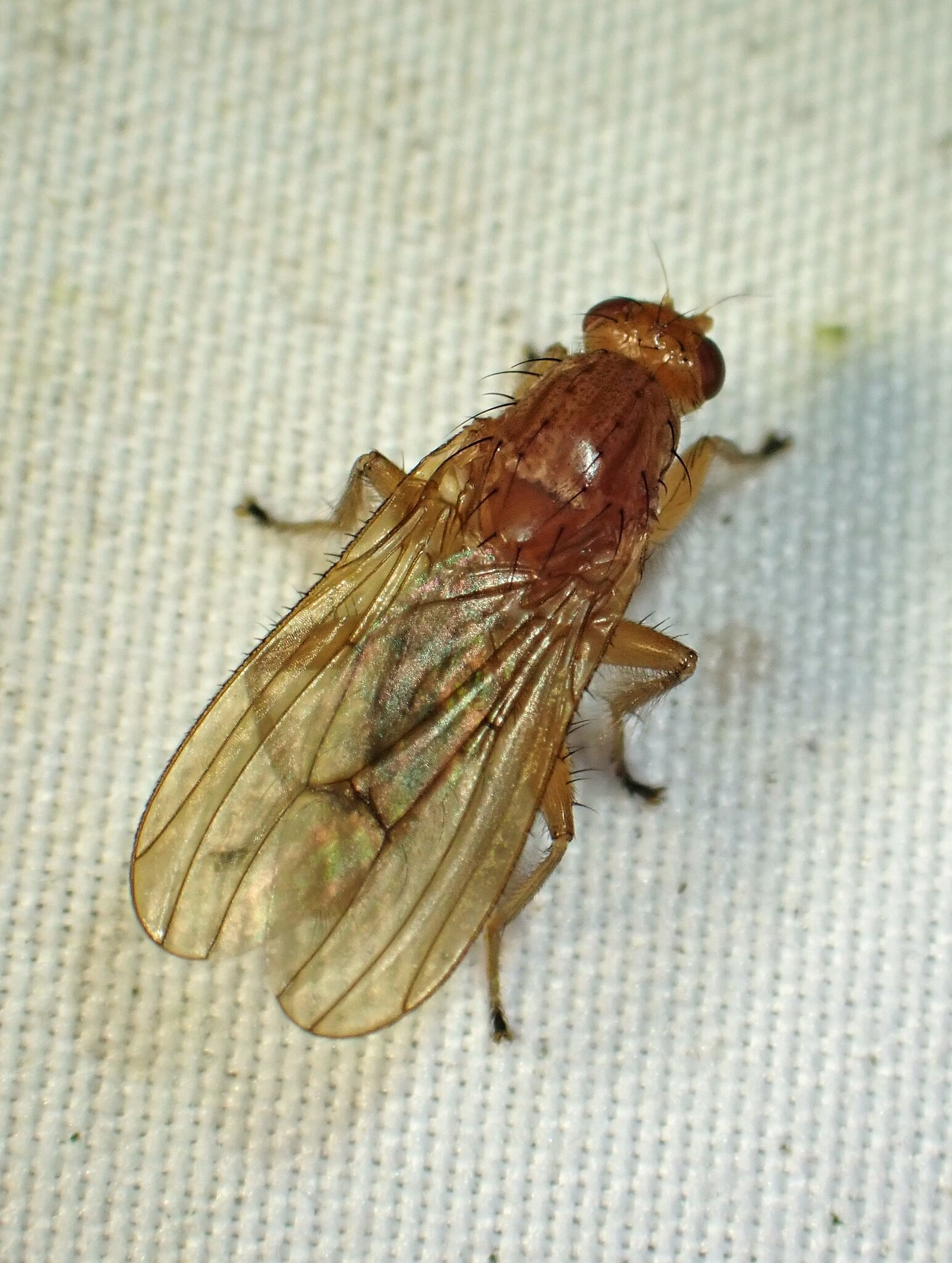

Scientific classification
- Domain: Eukaryota
- Kingdom: Animalia
- Phylum: Arthropoda
- Class: Insecta
- Order: Diptera
- Family: Heleomyzidae
- Genus: Suillia
- Species: S. longipennis

Binomial name
- Suillia longipennis (Loew, 1862)

Synonyms
- Helomyza longipennis Loew, 1862

= Suillia longipennis =

Species of fly

Suillia longipennis is a species of fly in the family Heleomyzidae. It is found in North America.
