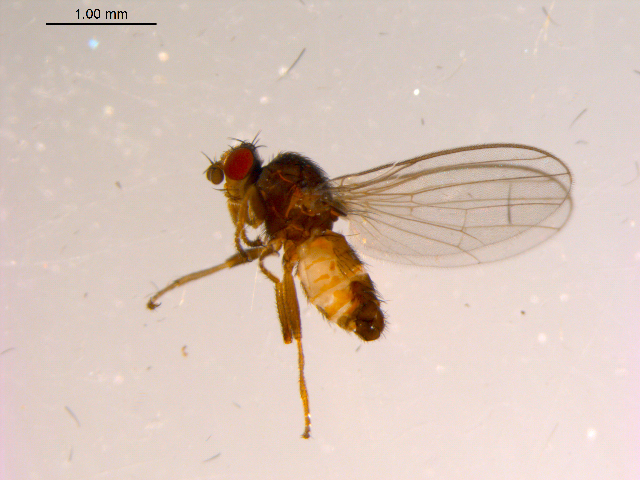

Scientific classification
- Domain: Eukaryota
- Kingdom: Animalia
- Phylum: Arthropoda
- Class: Insecta
- Order: Diptera
- Family: Heleomyzidae
- Genus: Borboropsis
- Species: B. puberula

Binomial name
- Borboropsis puberula (Zetterstedt, 1838)

Synonyms
- Anthophilina puberula Zetterstedt, 1838

= Borboropsis puberula =

Species of fly

Borboropsis puberula is a species of fly in the family Heleomyzidae. It is found in Europe.
