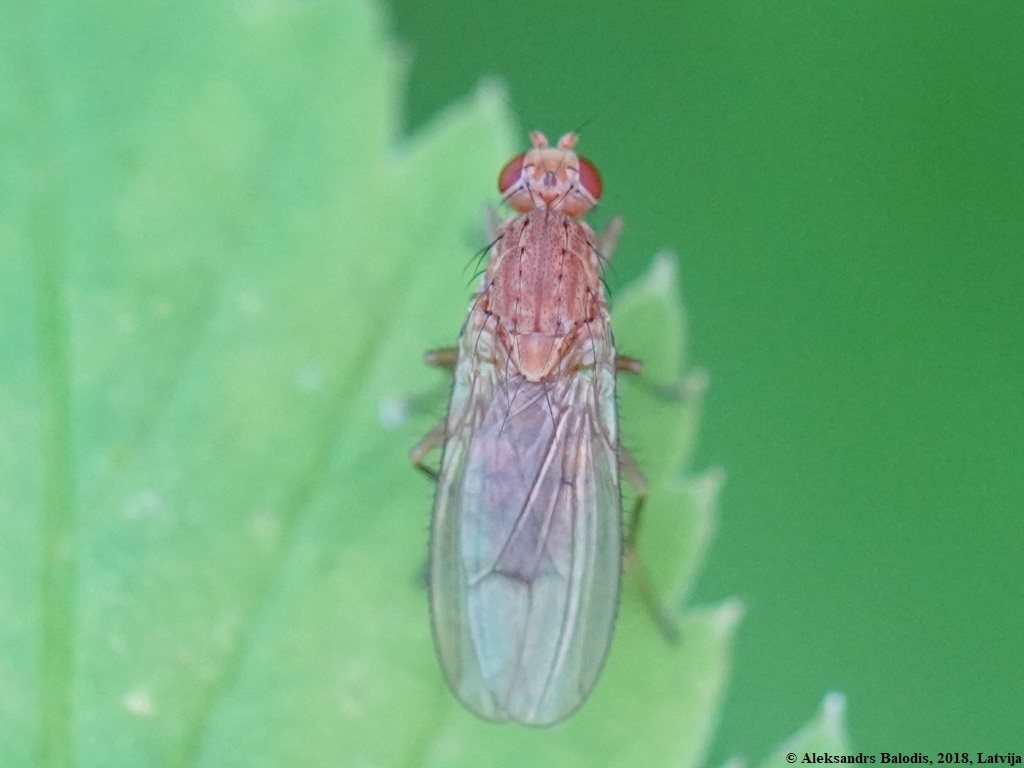

Scientific classification
- Kingdom: Animalia
- Phylum: Arthropoda
- Class: Insecta
- Order: Diptera
- Family: Heleomyzidae
- Genus: Suillia
- Species: S. flavifrons

Binomial name
- Suillia flavifrons (Zetterstedt, 1838)

Synonyms
- Helomyza flavifrons Zetterstedt, 1838; Helomyza infera Collin, 1943; Suillia infera (Collin, 1943)

= Suillia flavifrons =

Species of fly

Suillia flavifrons, is a European species of Heleomyzidae.
