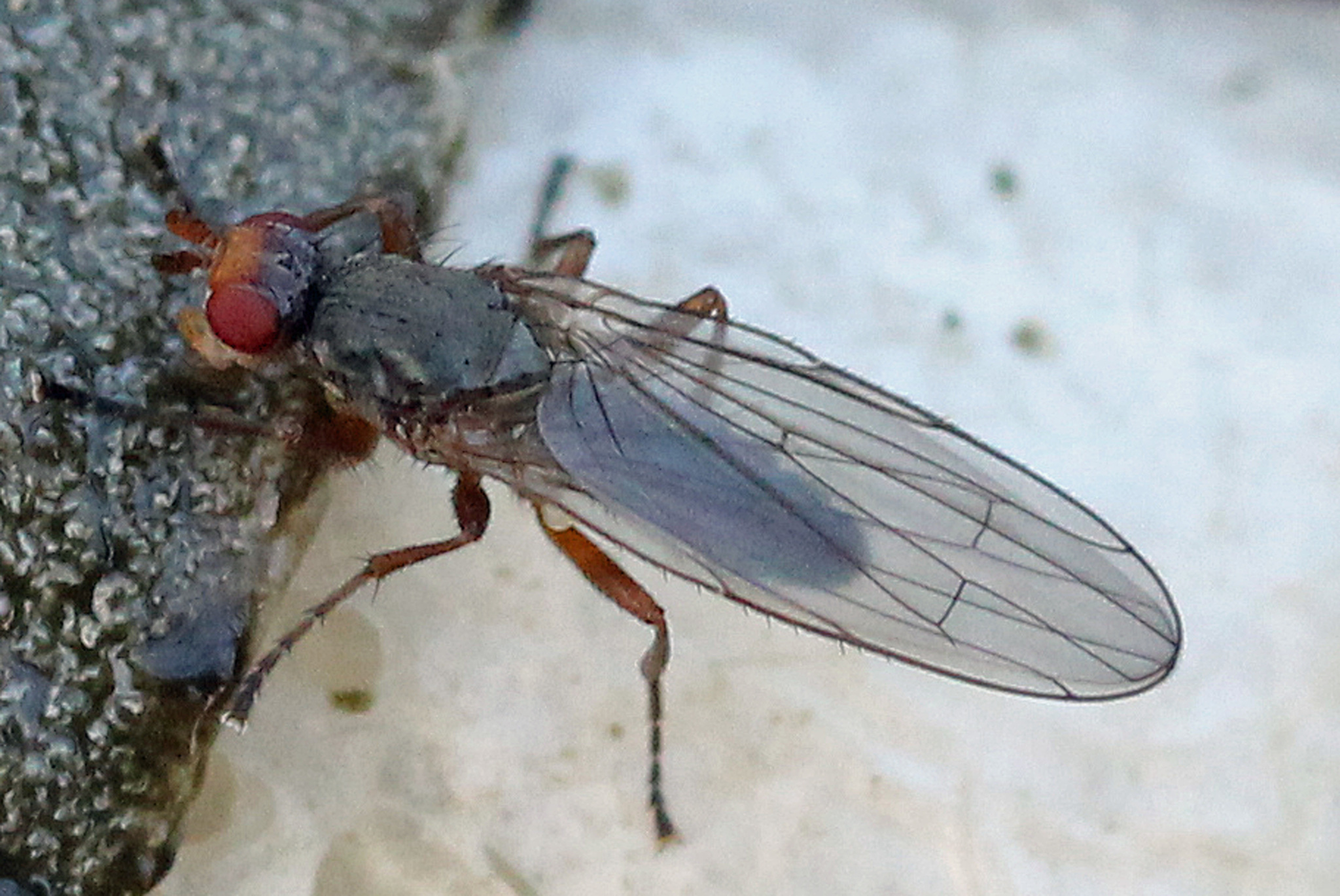

Scientific classification
- Kingdom: Animalia
- Phylum: Arthropoda
- Class: Insecta
- Order: Diptera
- Family: Heleomyzidae
- Genus: Orbellia
- Species: O. barbata

Binomial name
- Orbellia barbata (Garrett, 1921)

Synonyms
- Barbastoma barbata Garrett, 1921

= Orbellia barbata =

Species of fly

Orbellia barbata is a species of fly in the family Heleomyzidae.
