= Borboropsis =

Scientific classification
- Domain: Eukaryota
- Kingdom: Animalia
- Phylum: Arthropoda
- Class: Insecta
- Order: Diptera
- Family: Heleomyzidae
- Genus: Borboropsis; Czerny, 1902

Type species
- Anthomyza fulviceps Strobl, 1898

Genus of flies

Borboropsis is a genus of flies in the family Heleomyzidae. There are at least four described species in Borboropsis.

== Species ==
These four species belong to the genus Borboropsis:

- B. fulviceps (Strobl, 1898)^{i c g}
- B. puberula (Zetterstedt, 1838)^{i c g b}
- B. steyskali (Mathis, 1973)^{i c g}
- B. yakunoana Sasakawa, 2004^{c g}

Data sources: i = ITIS, c = Catalogue of Life, g = GBIF, b = Bugguide.net
