= Cinderella (fly) =

Scientific classification
- Domain: Eukaryota
- Kingdom: Animalia
- Phylum: Arthropoda
- Class: Insecta
- Order: Diptera
- Family: Heleomyzidae
- Genus: Cinderella; Steyskal, 1949

Type species
- Cinderella lampra Steyskal, 1949

Genus of flies

Cinderella is a genus of flies in the family Heleomyzidae. There are about six described species in Cinderella.

== Species ==
These six species belong to the genus Cinderella:

- C. aczeli Steyskal, 1969^{c g}
- C. hirsuta Hennig, 1969^{c g}
- C. lampra Steyskal, 1949^{i c g b}
- C. macalpinei Hennig, 1969^{c g}
- C. pollinosa Hennig, 1969^{c g}
- C. steyskali Hennig, 1969^{c g}

Data sources: i = ITIS, c = Catalogue of Life, g = GBIF, b = Bugguide.net
