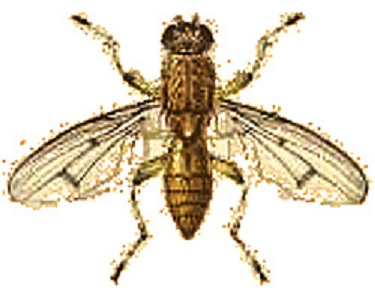

Scientific classification
- Kingdom: Animalia
- Phylum: Arthropoda
- Class: Insecta
- Order: Diptera
- Family: Heleomyzidae
- Genus: Suillia
- Species: S. gigantea

Binomial name
- Suillia gigantea (Meigen, 1830)

Synonyms
- Helomyza gigantea Meigen, 1830

= Suillia gigantea =

Species of fly

Suillia gigantea is a European species of Heleomyzidae.
