= Oecothea =

Scientific classification
- Domain: Eukaryota
- Kingdom: Animalia
- Phylum: Arthropoda
- Class: Insecta
- Order: Diptera
- Family: Heleomyzidae
- Tribe: Oecotheini
- Genus: Oecothea; Haliday, 1837

Synonyms
- Aecothea Of Authors

Genus of flies

Oecothea is a genus of flies in the family Heleomyzidae. There are at least 20 described species in Oecothea.

== Species ==
These 20 species belong to the genus Oecothea:

- O. acuta Gorodkov, 1959^{c g}
- O. aristata (Malloch, 1919)
- O. desertorum Gorodkov, 1959^{c g}
- O. dubia Gorodkov, 1959^{c g}
- O. dubinini Gorodkov, 1959^{c g}
- O. ellobii Gorodkov, 1978^{c g}
- O. fenestralis (Fallén, 1820)
- O. hamulifera Gorodkov, 1959^{c g}
- O. hungarica Papp, 1980^{c g}
- O. kapitonovi Gorodkov, 1964^{c g}
- O. longipes Gorodkov, 1959^{c g}
- O. macrocerca Gorodkov, 1959^{c g}
- O. mongolica Gorodkov, 1969^{c g}
- O. pakistanica (Okadome, 1991)^{c g}
- O. pamirica Gorodkov, 1959^{c g}
- O. praecox Loew, 1862^{c g}
- O. similis Gorodkov, 1969^{c g}
- O. specus (Aldrich, 1897)^{i c g b}
- O. syriaca Villeneuve, 1924^{c g}
- O. ushinskii Gorodkov, 1959^{c g}

Data sources: i = ITIS, c = Catalogue of Life, g = GBIF, b = Bugguide.net
