= Suillia tuberiperda =

Scientific classification
- Kingdom: Animalia
- Phylum: Arthropoda
- Class: Insecta
- Order: Diptera
- Family: Heleomyzidae
- Genus: Suillia
- Species: S. tuberiperda

Binomial name
- Suillia tuberiperda (Rondani, 1867)

Synonyms
- Helomyza tuberiperda Rondani, 1867

Species of fly

Suillia tuberiperda, the truffle fly, is a European species of Heleomyzidae.

Its larvae develop in truffles, a behavior exploited in the search for truffles. The eggs are deposited in the soil above the fruiting bodies, and the emerging larvae dig for the truffles.
