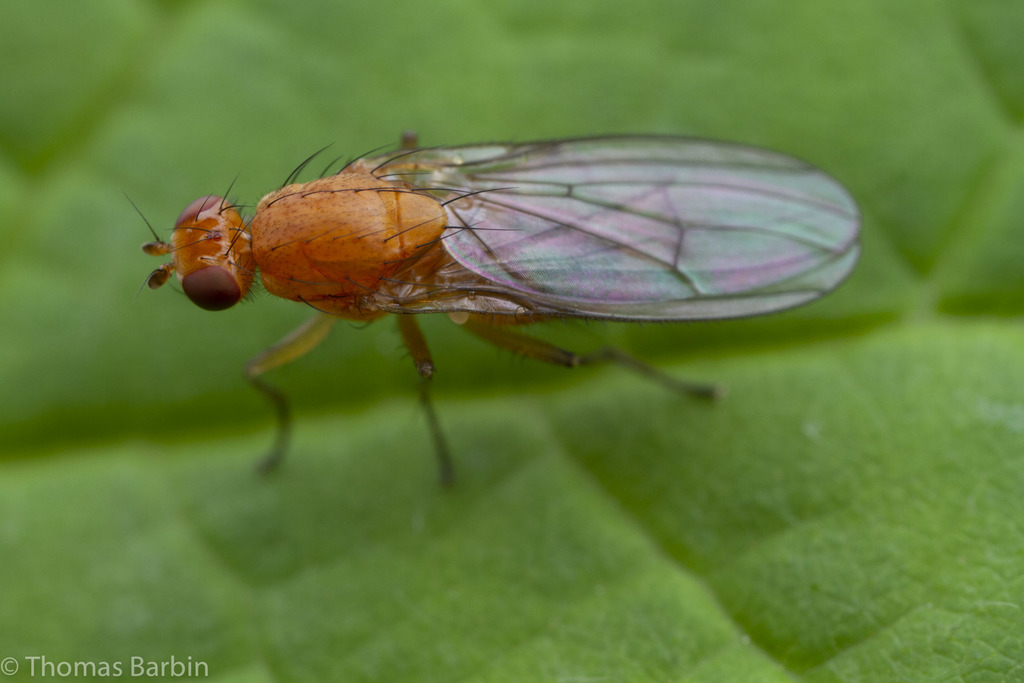
- Suillia convergens showing orbital plates

Scientific classification
- Kingdom: Animalia
- Phylum: Arthropoda
- Clade: Pancrustacea
- Class: Insecta
- Order: Diptera
- Family: Heleomyzidae
- Subfamily: Suilliinae; Bezzi, 1911

= Suilliinae =

Subfamily of flies

Suilliinae is a subfamily of flies in the family Heleomyzidae.

== Description ==
Suilliinae differ from other Heleomyzidae in that their orbital plates angle inward, away from the inner margins of the eyes. They are often associated with fungi.

== Taxonomy ==
Suilliinae contains the following genera:

- Suillia (= Allophyla)
- Porsenus
