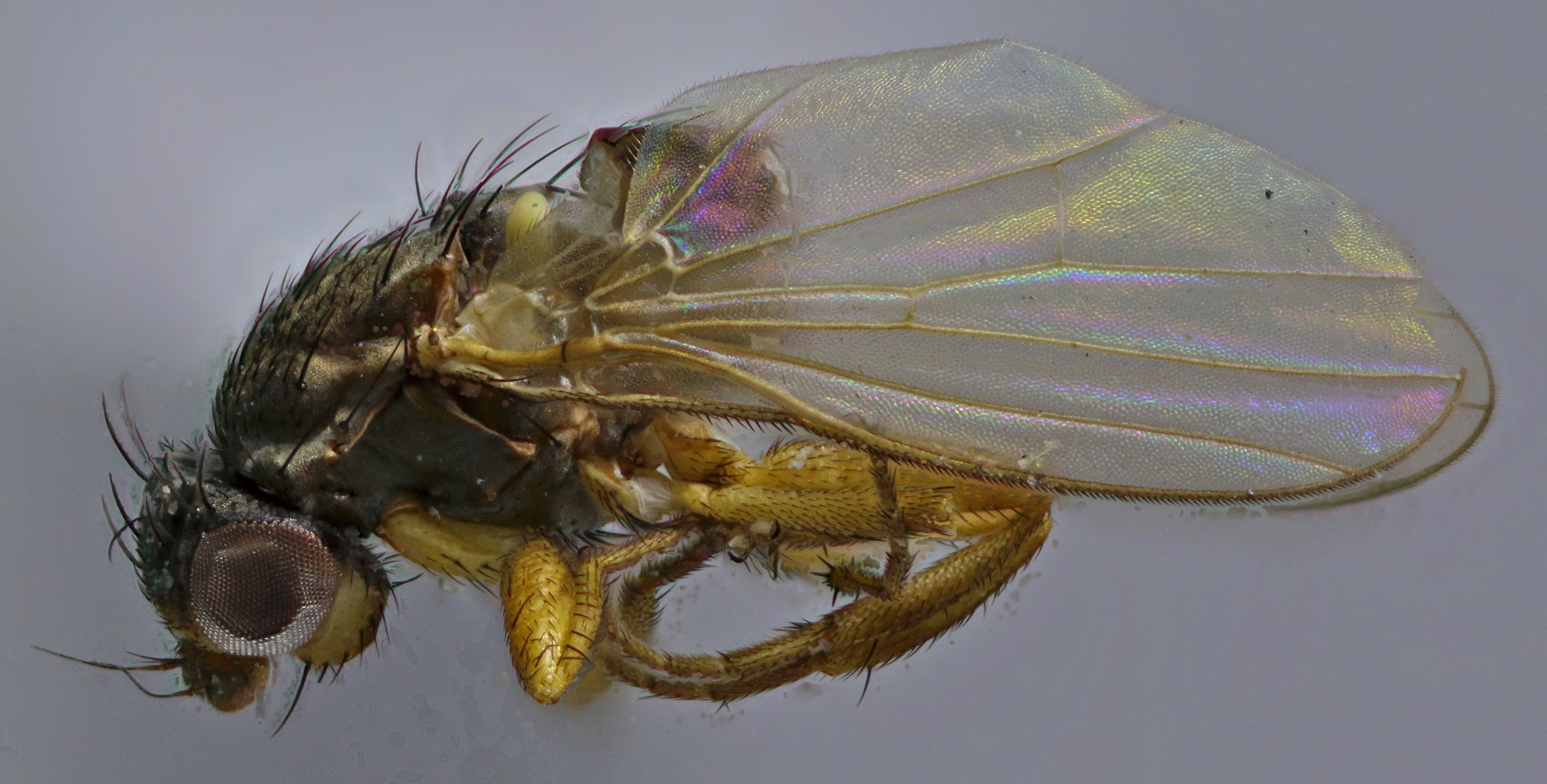
- Neossos tombstonensis

Scientific classification
- Kingdom: Animalia
- Phylum: Arthropoda
- Clade: Pancrustacea
- Class: Insecta
- Order: Diptera
- Family: Heleomyzidae
- Genus: Neossos; Malloch, 1927

Type species
- Neossos marylandicus Malloch, 1927

Synonyms
- Ornitholeria Frey, 1930

= Neossos =

Genus of flies

Neossos is a genus of flies in the family Heleomyzidae.

== Species ==
- Neossos atlanticus Gilbert & Wheeler, 2007
- Neossos broersei (de Meijere, 1946)
- Neossos californicus Melander, 1952
- Neossos marylandicus Malloch, 1927
- Neossos nidicola (Frey, 1930)
- Neossos tombstonensis Solecki & Wheeler, 2015
