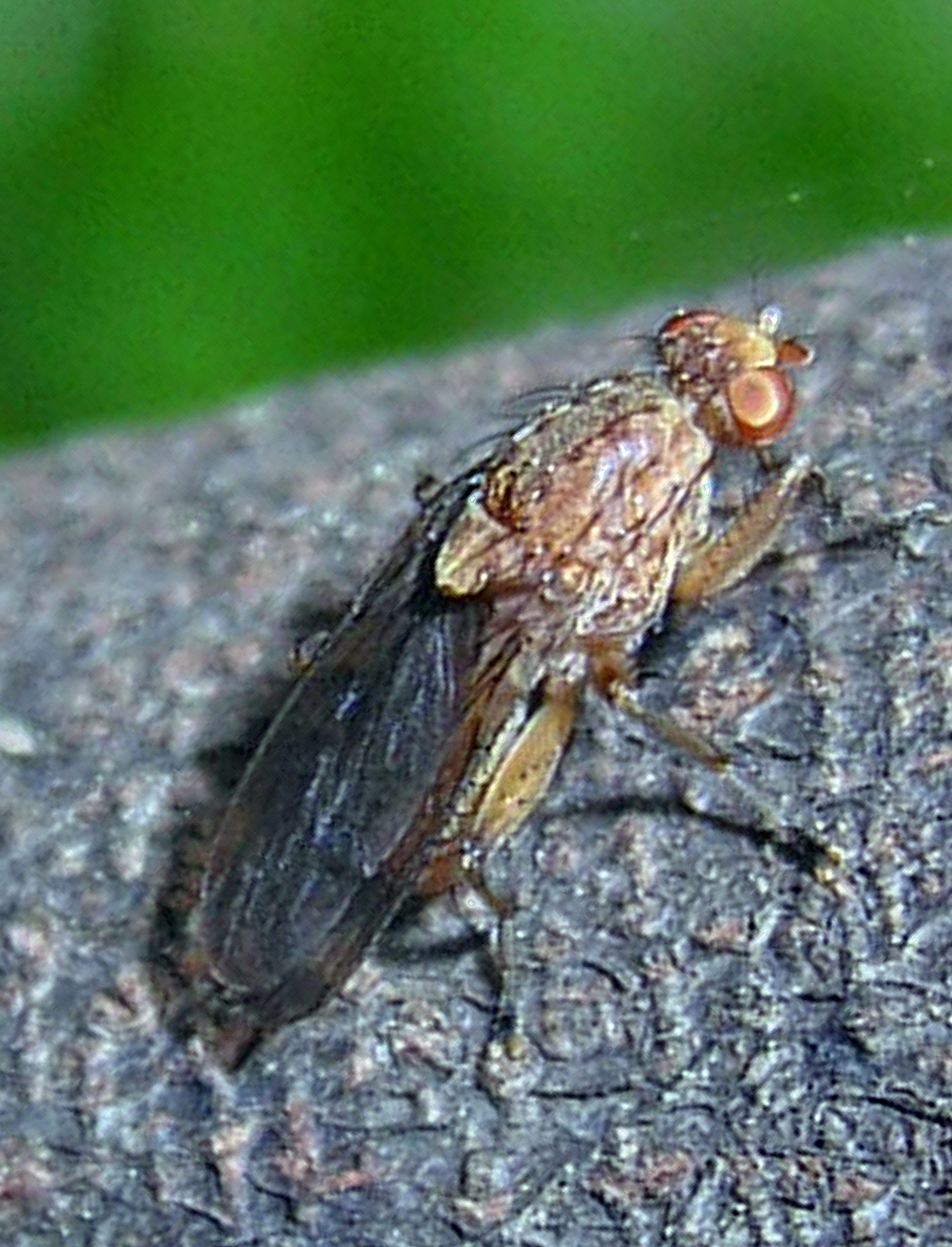
- Suillia fuscicornis

Scientific classification
- Kingdom: Animalia
- Phylum: Arthropoda
- Clade: Pancrustacea
- Class: Insecta
- Order: Diptera
- Family: Heleomyzidae
- Subfamily: Suilliinae
- Genus: Suillia; Robineau-Desvoidy, 1830

Type species
- Helomyza fungorum Robineau-Desvoidy, 1830

Synonyms
- Allophyla Loew, 1862; Helomyza Fallén, 1820

= Suillia =

Genus of flies

Suillia sp. in copula

Suillia is a genus of flies in the family Heleomyzidae. There are at least 130 described species in Suillia.

== Species ==
- S. acroleuca (Speiser, 1910)
- S. affinis (Meigen, 1830)
- S. alticola Gorodkov, 1977
- S. apicalis (Loew, 1862)
- S. asiatica Gorodkov, 1962
- S. aspinosa (Lamb, 1917)
- S. atricornis (Meigen, 1830)
- S. balteata (Lamb, 1917)
- S. barberi (Darlington, 1908)
- S. beigeri Woznica, 2007
- S. bicolor (Zetterstedt, 1838)
- S. bistrigata (Meigen, 1830)
- S. borneensis Okadome, 1985
- S. brunneipennis Czerny, 1932
- S. cepelaki Martinek, 1985
- S. cingulipleura Cogan, 1971
- S. collarti Cogan, 1971
- S. convergens (Walker, 1849)
- S. costalis (Matsumura, 1911)
- S. crinimana (Czerny, 1904)
- S. crinipes Czerny, 1935
- S. danielssoni Woznica, 2006
- S. dawnae Withers, 1987
- S. discolor Czerny, 1927
- S. distigma (Wulp, 1897)
- S. dumicola (Collin, 1943)
- S. elbergi Gorodkov, 1965
- S. femoralis (Loew, 1862)
- S. flagripes (Czerny, 1904)
- S. flava (Meigen, 1830)
- S. flavifrons (Zetterstedt, 1838)
- S. flavitarsis (Rondani, 1867)
- S. fuscicornis (Zetterstedt, 1847)
- S. gigantea (Meigen, 1830)
- S. gorodkovi Okadome, 1968
- S. grandis (Meijere, 1919)
- S. griseola (Meigen, 1830)
- S. grunini Gorodkov, 1977
- S. himalayensis Deeming, 1966
- S. hispanica (Loew, 1862)
- S. hololoma Steyskal, 1980
- S. huggerti Woznica, 2006
- S. humilis (Meigen, 1830)
- S. igori Martinek, 1985
- S. imberbis Czerny, 1924
- S. immaculata (Czerny, 1924)
- S. improcera Gorodkov, 1977
- S. inens (Giglio-Tos, 1893)
- S. ingens (Lamb, 1917)
- S. innotata (Becker, 1908)
- S. inornata (Loew, 1862)
- S. kashmirensis Okadome, 1990
- S. keiseri Cogan, 1971
- S. kroeberi Czerny, 1935
- S. kurahashii Okadome, 1991
- S. laciniata (Séguy, 1910)
- S. laevifrons (Loew, 1862)
- S. laevigata Gorodkov, 1977
- S. laevis (Loew, 1862)
- S. limbata (Thomson, 1869), formerly Helomyza limbata
- S. lineitergum (Pandellé, 1901)
- S. longicornis Gorodkov, 1962
- S. longipennis (Loew, 1862)
- S. lurida (Meigen, 1830)
- S. marginata Czerny, 1931
- S. matsutakevora Okadome, 2001
- S. mikii (Pokorny, 1886)
- S. mirabilis Woznica, 2004
- S. monticola Gorodkov, 1962
- S. nartshukella Gorodkov, 1965
- S. nemorum (Meigen, 1830)
- S. nigripes Czerny, 1932
- S. notata (Meigen, 1830)
- S. oceana (Becker, 1908)
- S. oldenbergii (Czerny, 1904)
- S. ovata (Collart, 1946)
- S. oxyphora (Mik, 1900)
- S. pakistanensis Okadome, 1991
- S. pallida (Fallén, 1820)
- S. parva (Loew, 1862)
- S. phyllopyga Gorodkov, 1977
- S. picieti Gorodkov, 1978
- S. picta (Wiedemann, 1830)
- S. pilimana (Loew, 1862)
- S. plumata (Loew, 1862)
- S. polystigma (Wulp, 1897)
- S. prima Hendel, 1913
- S. punctifrons Gorodkov, 1962
- S. punctulata (Wulp, 1897)
- S. quadrilineata Czerny, 1924
- S. quadrimaculata Woznica, 2007
- S. quinquepunctata (Say, 1823)
- S. quinquevittata (Macquart, 1839)
- S. rubida (Coquillett, 1898)
- S. setitarsis (Czerny, 1904)
- S. similis (Meigen, 1838)
- S. sororcula Czerny, 1926
- S. spinicoxa Okadome, 1991
- S. steyskali Woznica, 2006
- S. straeleni (Collart, 1946)
- S. stuckenbergi Woznica, 2012
- S. subdola Czerny, 1927
- S. taigensis Gorodkov, 1979
- S. taiwanensis Okadome, 1985
- S. takasagomontana Okadome, 1967
- S. teberdensis Gorodkov, 1979
- S. tenebrosa Gorodkov, 1977
- S. thaiensis Okadome, 1985
- S. thandianensis Okadome, 1991
- S. tokugoensis Okadome, 2001
- S. tuberiperda (Rondani, 1867)
- S. tuberis (Vallot, 1802)
- S. uenoi Okadome, 1985
- S. umbratica (Meigen, 1835)
- S. umbrinervis Czerny, 1932
- S. umbrosa Okadome, 1991
- S. univittata (von Roser, 1840)
- S. usambara Cogan, 1971
- S. ussurigena Czerny, 1932
- S. ustulata (Meigen, 1830)
- S. vaginata (Loew, 1862)
- S. valentinae Gorodkov, 1962
- S. valleyi Steyskal, 1972
- S. variegata (Loew, 1862)
- S. venustula (Collart, 1946)
- S. vergarae Steyskal, 1980
- S. vicaria Gorodkov, 1976
- S. vicina (Collart, 1946)
- S. vietnamensis Okadome, 1985
- S. villeneuvei Czerny, 1924
- S. vockerothi Cogan, 1971

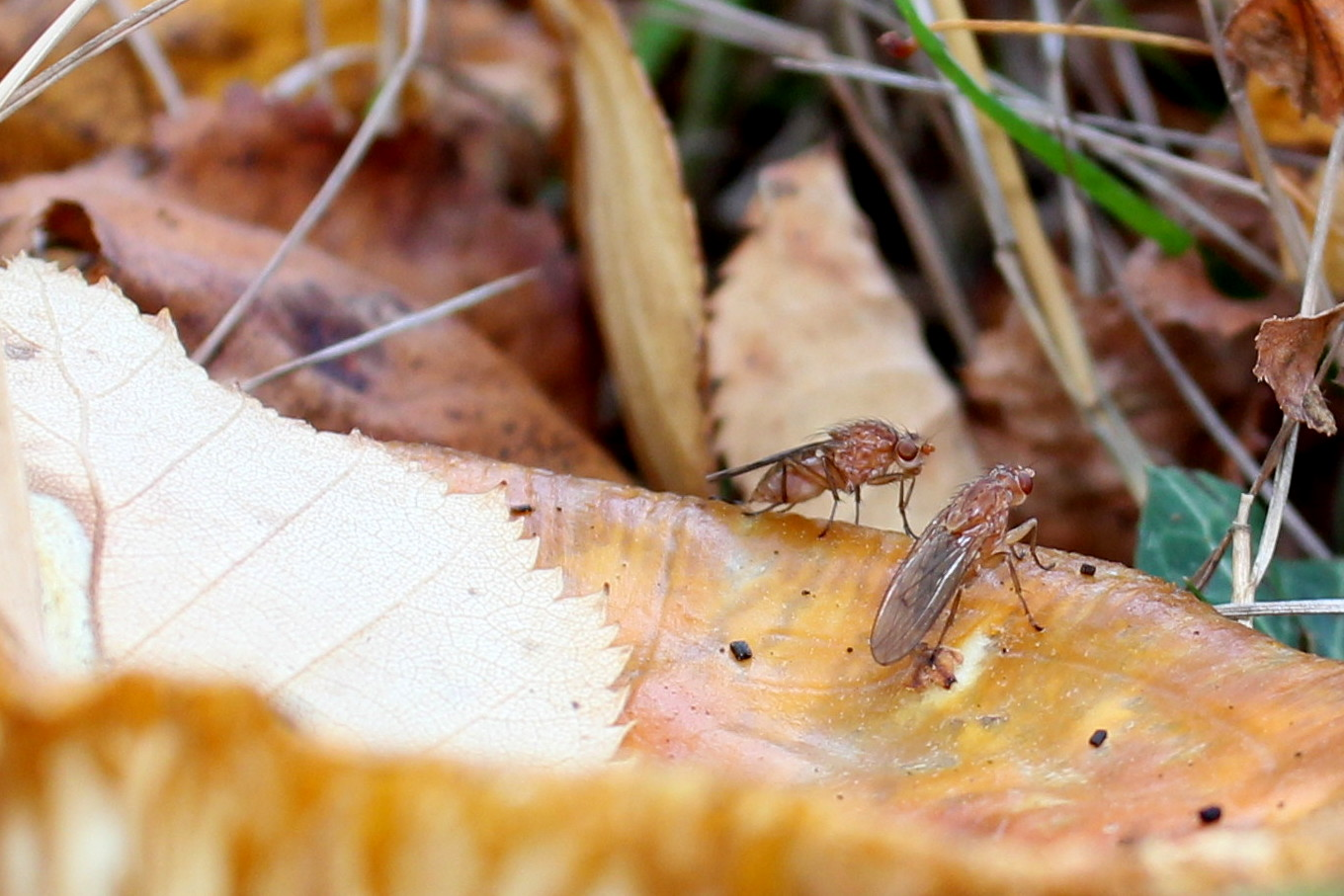
