= Leander Czerny =

Austrian entomologist (1859–1944)

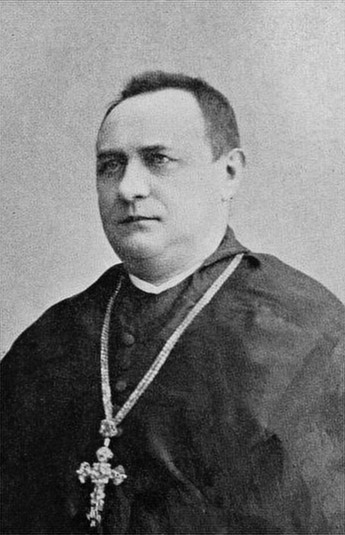
Leander Franz Czerny

Leander (Franz) Czerny (4 October 1859 – 22 November 1944) was an Austrian entomologist and priest. He was mainly interested in Diptera.

== Biography ==
Czerny was born on 4 October 1859 in Modřice, Moravia. Czerny, who wrote extensively on Diptera between 1900 and 1939, describing many genera and species, was a major contributor to Erwin Lindner's Die Fliegen der paläarktischen Region ("The Flies of the Palaearctic Region"), the most significant work on the group in the 20th century.

Czerny wrote the sections on the following families:-

- Heleomyzidae, Trichoscelidae, Chyromyidae (1927)
- Anthomyzidae, Opomyzidae, Tethinidae, Clusiidae (1928)
- Micropezidae (Tylidae), Neridrinae, Platypezidae (as Clythiidae), Dryomyzidae, Neottiophilidae (1930)
- Lauxaniidae (Sapromyzidae) (1932)
- Musidoridae (Lonchopteridae), Lonchaeidae (1934)
- Chamaemyiidae (Ochthiphilidae) (1936)

He was also abbot of the Benedictine Kremsmünster Abbey from 1905 to 1929 and collected there as well as in Pettenbach on the Upper Danube. As well as Diptera he collected Lepidoptera. His collections of both are now in the Natural History Museum in Vienna. He died on 22 November 1944 in Pettenbach, at the age of 85.
