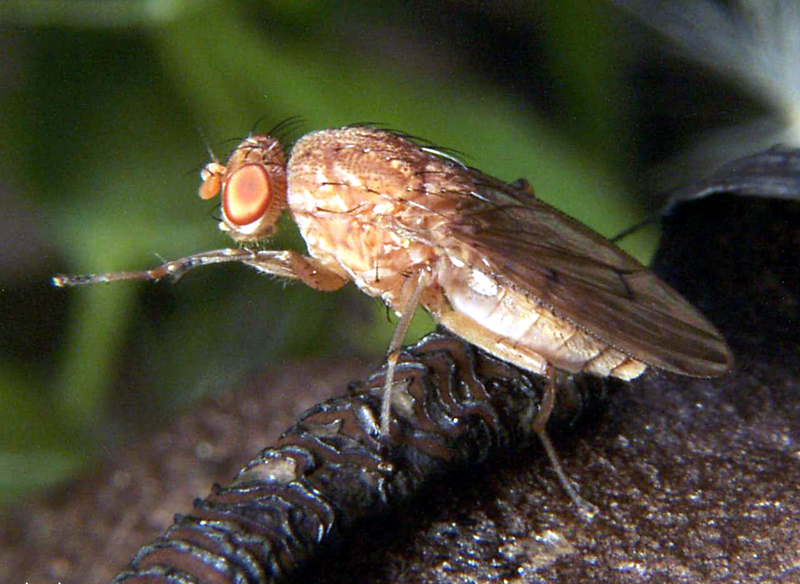
- Suillia sp.

Scientific classification
- Domain: Eukaryota
- Kingdom: Animalia
- Phylum: Arthropoda
- Class: Insecta
- Order: Diptera
- Section: Schizophora
- Subsection: Acalyptratae
- Superfamily: Sphaeroceroidea
- Family: Heleomyzidae; Westwood, 1840

Subfamilies
- Borboropsinae; Chiropteromyzinae; Cinderellinae; Cnemospathidinae; Diaciinae; Heleomyzinae; Heteromyzinae; Rhinotorinae; Suilliinae; Tapeigastrinae; Trixoscelidinae

Diversity
- At least 80 genera

= Heleomyzidae =

Family of flies

Mating behaviour of Suillia cf. bicolor on fungus

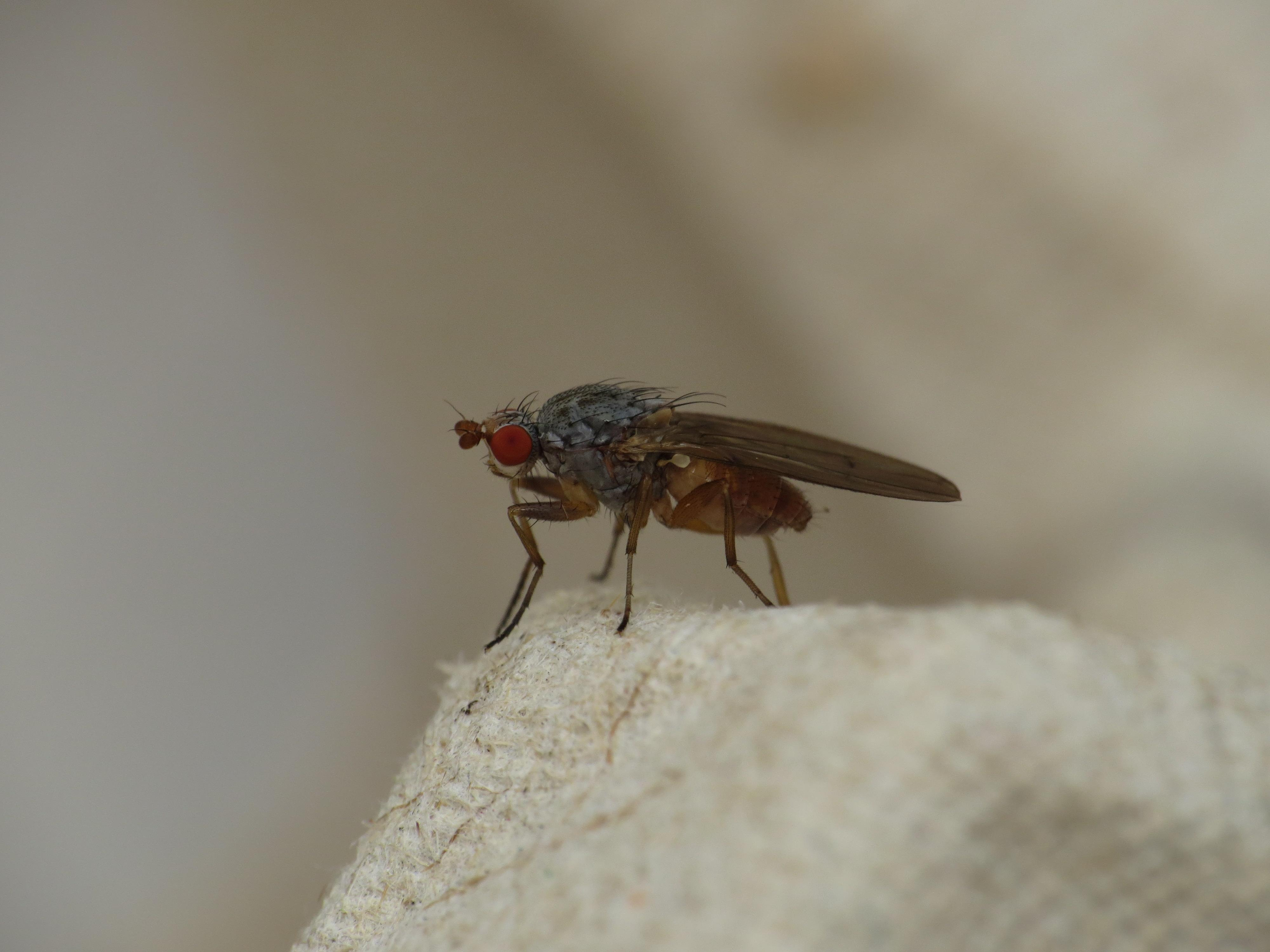
Tephrochlamys

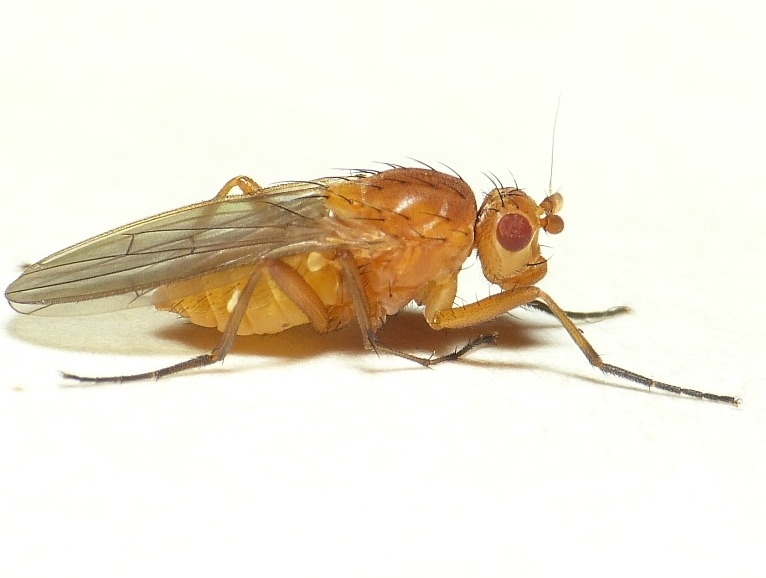
Eccoptomera longiseta

The Heleomyzidae is a small family of true flies in the insect order Diptera. Over 740 described species of Heleomyzidae occur in about 76 genera distributed throughout the world.

== Description ==
Heleomyzids are small to medium-sized flies which vary in colour from yellow to reddish yellow or reddish brown to black. The wings often have small but distinctly longer, well-spaced spines mixed with the shorter spines along the leading edge and the crossveins are often clouded.

== Taxonomy ==
Over 740 described species of Heleomyzidae occur in about 76 genera and 22 tribes distributed throughout the world; the greatest number occur in the Holarctic region. Around 100 species of Heleomyzidae are found in North America. Most of the subfamilies have been commonly recognized as families in the past, but are now included within the Heleomyzidae. The composition and monophyly of the family continues to be controversial. McAlpine recently combined Heleomyzidae and Sphaeroceridae into Heteromyzidae, but this arrangement has not been widely accepted.

== Ecology ==
Adults of Borboroides and Heleomicra are attracted to carcasses and faeces. Larvae feed on decaying plant and animal matter, mushrooms, and various fungi. The larvae of the Holarctic Suilliinae and Tapeigaster occur principally in fungi. Larvae of Cairnsimyia live in borer tunnels in trees.
