= List of Rivellia species =

This is a list of 147 species in the genus Rivellia.

== Rivellia species ==
- R. abana Curran, 1929
- R. acuticornis Frey, 1932
- R. aequifera (Walker, 1862)
- R. affinis Hendel, 1914
- R. albitarsis (Macquart, 1843)
- R. albopilosa Hendel, 1914
- R. alini Enderlein, 1937
- R. angstifacia Frey, 1932
- R. angulata Hendel, 1914
- R. anomala Hendel, 1914
- R. apicalis Hendel, 1934
- R. asiatica Hennig, 1945
- R. atriventris Hendel, 1914
- R. australis Namba, 1956
- R. basilaris (Wiedemann, 1830)
- R. basilaroides Hendel, 1933
- R. bipars (Walker, 1861)
- R. boscii Robineau-Desvoidy, 1830
- R. brevifasciata Johnson, 1900
- R. brunifascia Hendel, 1914
- R. cestoventris Byun, Suh, Han & Kwon, 2001
- R. charbinensis Enderlein, 1937
- R. chlaybescens Frey, 1932
- R. cladis Hendel, 1914
- R. cognata Cresson, 1919
- R. colei Namba, 1956
- R. concisivitta (Walker, 1862)
- R. conjuncta Loew, 1873
- R. connata (Thomson, 1869)
- R. connecta Wulp, 1898
- R. connexa Hendel, 1914
- R. coquilletti Hendel, 1914
- R. costaepunctata Frey, 1964
- R. costalis Hendel, 1914
- R. curvata Hendel, 1914
- R. curvinervis Hara, 1994
- R. dasyixys Hara, 1994
- R. decatomoides (Walker, 1860)
- R. depicta Hennig, 1945
- R. dimidiata de Meijere, 1908
- R. discalis Hendel, 1914
- R. distobasalis Hardy, 1959
- R. euxestoides Hendel, 1914
- R. gracilis Hendel, 1914
- R. ferruginea Hendel, 1914
- R. flagellaris Frey, 1934
- R. flavimana Loew, 1873
- R. flavipes Hara, 1994
- R. flexuosa Wulp, 1898
- R. floridana Johnson, 1900
- R. frugalis Coquillett, 1904
- R. fulvescens Malloch, 1940
- R. fulvidorsalis Hara, 1994
- R. furcata Hendel, 1914
- R. fusca (Thomson, 1869)
- R. gamma Hendel, 1914
- R. gracilis Hendel, 1914
- R. granulata Frey, 1932
- R. harai Byun & Suh, 1998
- R. hendeli Meijere, 1914
- R. hendeliana Bezzi, 1916
- R. herinella Hendel, 1914
- R. hispanica Lyneborg, 1969
- R. humphreyi Frey, 1932
- R. imitabilis Namba, 1956
- R. imitans Malloch, 1930
- R. impunctata Hendel, 1914
- R. inaequata Namba, 1956
- R. interrupta (Macquart, 1835)
- R. isara (Walker, 1849)
- R. isolata Malloch, 1930
- R. itoi Hara, 1992
- R. kaochangensis Hara, 1994
- R. latifascia Hendel, 1914
- R. lavata Hendel, 1914
- R. ligata (Say, 1830)
- R. longialata Byun & Suh, 1998
- R. longicornis Wulp, 1898
- R. macilenta (Wiedemann, 1830)
- R. maculipennis (Bigot, 1886)
- R. magniclypeata Hara, 1993
- R. major Adams, 1905
- R. mandschurica Hennig, 1945
- R. marginalis Hendel, 1931
- R. marina Malloch, 1940
- R. mediocris Hendel, 1914
- R. melliginis (Fitch, 1855)
- R. mentissa (Walker, 1849)
- R. metallica (Wulp, 1867)
- R. micans Loew, 1873
- R. michiganensis Namba, 1956
- R. multicolor Frey, 1964
- R. munda Namba, 1956
- R. neotera Speiser, 1915
- R. nigrioccipitalis Hara, 1993
- R. nigripes (Macquart, 1851)
- R. nigroapicalis Byun, Suh, Han & Kwon, 2001
- R. obliqua (Walker, 1861)
- R. occulta Wulp, 1898
- R. otroeda (Walker, 1849)
- R. pallida Loew, 1873
- R. parallela Hendel, 1914
- R. pilosula Wulp, 1898
- R. pipartita Hendel, 1933
- R. polita Hendel, 1932
- R. pulchra Hendel, 1914
- R. pulchricosta Frey, 1964
- R. quadrifasciata (Macquart, 1835)
- R. quadrivittata (Macquart, 1843)
- R. radiata Hendel, 1914
- R. rectangula Hendel, 1914
- R. rufibasis Malloch, 1939
- R. rufitarsis (Macquart, 1855)
- R. sauteri Hendel, 1914
- R. scutellaris Hendel, 1933
- R. severini Blanton, 1937
- R. similis Hendel, 1914
- R. sinuosa Coquillett, 1904
- R. socialis Namba, 1956
- R. sphenisca Hendel, 1933
- R. stenotata Steyskal, 1960
- R. steyskali Namba, 1956
- R. submetallescens Frey, 1964
- R. submetallica Wulp, 1898
- R. subvittata Lindner, 1957
- R. succinata (Wiedemann, 1830)
- R. succincta Frey, 1932
- R. sumbawana Hennig, 1941
- R. syngenesiae (Fabricius, 1781)
- R. tersa Namba, 1956
- R. texana Namba, 1956
- R. tomentosa Hendel, 1914
- R. tridentata Byun & Suh, 1998
- R. trigona Hendel, 1914
- R. trimucronata Frey, 1932
- R. unifascia Frey, 1932
- R. vacillans (Walker, 1860)
- R. vaga Namba, 1956
- R. varia Hara, 1994
- R. variabilis Loew, 1873
- R. virgo Hendel, 1914
- R. viridis Hendel, 1914
- R. viridulans Robineau-Desvoidy, 1830
- R. winifredae Namba, 1956
- R. woodi Frey, 1932
- R. wulpiana Hendel, 1914
- R. yaeyamaensis Hara, 1989
