= List of Platystomatidae genera =

These 127 genera belong to the family Platystomatidae, signal flies. There are at least 1,100 described species in Platystomatidae.

== Platystomatidae genera ==
- Achias Fabricius, 1805^{c g}
- Aetha McAlpine, 2001^{c g}
- Agadasys Whittington, 2000^{c g}
- Aglaioptera Frey, 1964^{c g}
- Agrochira Enderlein, 1911^{c g}
- Amphicnephes Loew, 1873
- Angelopteromyia Korneyev, 2001^{c g}
- Angitula Walker, 1859^{c g}
- Antineura Osten Sacken, 1881^{c g}
- Apactoneura Malloch, 1930^{c g}
- Apiola McAlpine, 1973^{c g}
- Asyntona Osten Sacken, 1881^{c g}
- Atopocnema Enderlein, 1922^{c g}
- Atopognathus Bigot, 1881^{c g}
- Bama McAlpine, 2001^{c g}
- Boisduvalia Robineau-Desvoidy, 1830^{c g}
- Brea Walker, 1859^{c g}
- Bromophila Loew, 1873
- Carolimyia Malloch, 1931
- Chaetorivellia de Meijere, 1913^{c g}
- Cladoderris Bezzi, 1914^{c g}
- Cleitamia Macquart, 1835^{c g}
- Cleitamoides Malloch, 1939^{c g}
- Clitodoca Loew, 1873
- Coelocephala Karsch, 1888^{c g}
- Conicipithea Hendel, 1912^{c g}
- Conopariella Enderlein, 1922^{c g}
- Dayomyia McAlpine, 2007^{c g}
- Duomyia Walker, 1849^{c g}
- Elassogaster Bigot, 1860^{c g}
- Engistoneura Loew, 1873
- Eopiara Frey, 1964
- Eosamphicnephes Frey, 1932^{c g}
- Eudasys Whittington, 2003^{c g}
- Eumeka McAlpine, 2001^{c g}
- Euprosopia Macquart, 1847^{c g}
- Eurypalpus Macquart, 1835^{c g}
- Euthyplatystoma Hendel, 1914^{c g}
- Euxestomoea Meijere, 1913^{c g}
- Federleyella Frey, 1932^{c g}
- Furcamyia Whittington, 2003^{c g}
- Guamomyia Malloch, 1942^{c g}
- Himeroessa Loew, 1873
- Hysma McAlpine, 2001^{c g}
- Icteracantha Hendel, 1912^{c g}
- Imugana Enderlein, 1937^{c g}
- Inium McAlpine, 1995^{c g}
- Laglaizia Bigot, 1878^{c g}
- Lambia Hendel, 1914^{c g}
- Lamprogaster Macquart, 1843^{c g}
- Lamprophthalma Portschinsky, 1892^{c g}
- Lenophila Guérin-Méneville, 1843^{c g}
- Lophoplatystoma Hendel, 1914^{c g}
- Loxoceromyia Hendel, 1914^{c g}
- Loxoneura Macquart, 1835^{c g}
- Loxoneuroides Hendel, 1914^{c g}
- Lule Speiser, 1910^{c g}
- Lulodes Enderlein, 1924^{c g}
- Meringomeria Enderlein, 1924
- Mesanopin Enderlein, 1912
- Mesoctenia Enderlein, 1924^{c g}
- Metoposparga Enderlein, 1924^{c g}
- Mezona Speiser, 1910^{c g}
- Microepicausta Hendel, 1914^{c g}
- Micronesomyia Whittington, 2003^{c g}
- Mindanaia Malloch, 1931^{c g}
- Montrouziera Bigot, 1860^{c g}
- Naupoda Osten Sacken, 1881^{c g}
- Neoardelio Hendel, 1914^{c g}
- Neoepidesma Hendel, 1914^{c g}
- Neohemigaster Malloch, 1939^{c g}
- Oeciotypa Hendel, 1914^{c g}
- Oedemachilus Bigot, 1860^{c g}
- Palpomya Robineau-Desvoidy, 1830^{c g}
- Par McAlpine, 2001^{c g}
- Parardelio Hendel, 1912^{c g}
- Paryphodes Speiser, 1911^{c g}
- Peltacanthina Enderlein, 1912^{c g}
- Peronotrochus Enderlein, 1924
- Phasiamya Walker, 1849^{c g}
- Philocompus Osten Sacken, 1881^{c g}
- Phlebophis Frey, 1932^{c g}
- Phlyax McAlpine, 2001^{c g}
- Phytalmodes Bezzi & Bezzi, 1908^{c g}
- Piara Loew, 1873
- Picrometopus Frey, 1930^{c g}
- Plagiostenopterina Hendel, 1912^{c g}
- Plastotephritis Enderlein, 1922^{c g}
- Platystoma Meigen, 1803^{c g b}
- Poecilotraphera Hendel, 1914^{c g}
- Pogonortalis Hendel, 1911^{i c g b}
- Polystodes Robineau-Desvoidy, 1830^{c g}
- Prosopoconus Enderlein, 1922^{c g}
- Prosthiochaeta Enderlein, 1924^{c g}
- Pseudepicausta Hendel, 1912^{c g}
- Pseudocleitamia Malloch, 1939^{c g}
- Pseudorichardia Hendel, 1911^{c g}
- Pseudoscholastes Frey, 1932
- Pterogenia Bigot, 1859^{c g}
- Pterogenomyia Hendel, 1914^{c g}
- Rhegmatosaga Frey, 1930^{c g}
- Rhytidortalis Hendel, 1914^{c g}
- Rivellia Robineau-Desvoidy, 1830^{i c g b}
- Scelostenopterina Hendel, 1914^{c g}
- Scholastes Loew, 1873
- Scotinosoma Loew, 1873
- Seguyopiara Steyskal, 1990^{c g}
- Senopterina Macquart, 1835^{i c g b}
- Signa McAlpine, 2001^{c g}
- Sors McAlpine, 2007^{c g}
- Sphenoprosopa Loew, 1873
- Stellapteryx Whittington, 2003^{c g}
- Steyskaliella Soós, 1978^{c g}
- Tarfa McAlpine, 2001^{c g}
- Terzia McAlpine, 2001^{c g}
- Tomeus McAlpine, 2001^{c g}
- Traphera Loew, 1873
- Trigonosoma Gray, 1832^{c g}
- Valonia Walker, 1856^{c g}
- Venacalva Whittington, 2003^{c g}
- Xenaspis Osten Sacken, 1881^{c g}
- Xenaspoides Frey, 1930^{c g}
- Xiria Walker, 1856^{c g}
- Xiriella Frey, 1964
- Xyrogena Whittington, 2003^{c g}
- Zealandortalis Malloch, 1930^{c g}
- Zygaenula Doleschall, 1858^{c g}

Data sources: i = ITIS, c = Catalogue of Life, g = GBIF, b = Bugguide.net
