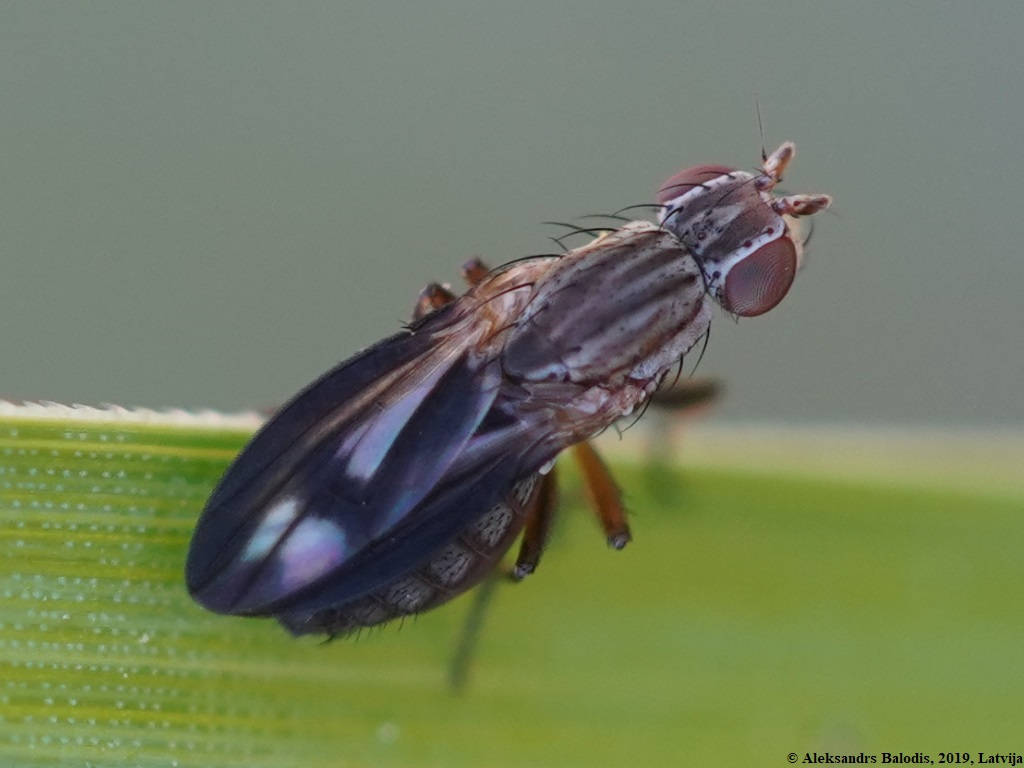
- Trixoscelis marginella

Scientific classification
- Kingdom: Animalia
- Phylum: Arthropoda
- Clade: Pancrustacea
- Class: Insecta
- Order: Diptera
- Family: Heleomyzidae
- Genus: Trixoscelis; Rondani, 1856

Type species
- Geomyza obscurella Fallén, 1823

Synonyms
- Trichoscelis Czerny; Geomyza Fallén, 1810

= Trixoscelis =

Genus of flies

Trixoscelis is a genus of flies in the family Heleomyzidae. For the most part they are small to minute flies found in warm semi-arid conditions on sand dunes, dry grasslands or shrubby places. They are widely distributed in the Palaearctic.

== Species ==
These 94 species belong to the genus Trixoscelis:

- T. adnubila Cogan, 1977^{c g}
- T. albinervis (Roser, 1840)^{c g}
- T. approximata (Loew, 1865)^{c g}
- T. auroflava Soós, 1977^{c g}
- T. baliogastra (Czerny, 1909)^{g}
- T. beckeri Soós, 1977^{c g}
- T. bistriata Soós, 1977^{c g}
- T. brandbergensis Woźnica, 2000^{c g}
- T. brincki Cogan, 1971^{c g}
- T. buccata Melander, 1952^{i c g}
- T. canescens (Loew, 1865)^{c g}
- T. cinerea (Coquillett, 1902)^{i c g}
- T. claripennis (Malloch, 1913)^{i c g}
- T. coei (Bequaert, 1960)^{c g}
- T. coetzeci Cogan, 1977^{c g}
- T. cogani Woźnica, 2000^{c g}
- T. costalis (Coquillett, 1901)^{c g}
- T. crassitarsa Soós, 1977^{c g}
- T. curvata Carles-Tolra, 1993^{c g}
- T. deemingi Woźnica, 2009^{c g}
- T. deserta (Melander, 1952)^{i c g b}
- T. deserticola Cogan, 1977^{c g}
- T. discolor Soós, 1977^{c g}
- T. dumbii Cogan, 1977^{c g}
- T. flagellata Carles-Tolra & Ventura, 2001^{c g}
- T. flavens (Melander, 1952)^{i c g}
- T. flavida (Melander, 1952)^{i c g b}
- T. flavipalpis Cogan, 1971^{c g}
- T. franzi Soós, 1979^{c g}
- T. frontalis (Fallén, 1823)^{i c g}
- T. fucipennis Cogan, 1971^{i c g}
- T. fumipennis (Melander, 1913)^{c g}
- T. gentilis (Frey, 1936)^{c g}
- T. gigans Carles-Tolra, 2001^{c g}
- T. hessei Cogan, 1971^{c g}
- T. incognita Woźnica, 2000^{c g}
- T. intermedia Cogan, 1971^{c g}
- T. irrorata Cogan, 1977^{c g}
- T. jonesi Cogan, 1977^{c g}
- T. jugoslaviensis (Bequaert, 1960)^{c g}
- T. laeta (Becker, 1907)^{c g}
- T. lindneri Cogan, 1977^{c g}
- T. litorea (Aldrich, 1908)^{i c g}
- T. lyneborgi Hackman, 1970^{c g}
- T. marginella (Fallén, 1823)^{c g}
- T. margo Papp, 2005^{c g}
- T. melanderi (Vockeroth, 1965)^{i c g}
- T. mendezabali Hackman, 1970^{c g}
- T. migueli Woźnica, 2009^{c g}
- T. millennica Woźnica, 2000^{c g}
- T. mixta Soós, 1977^{c g}
- T. mohavea (Melander, 1952)^{i c g}
- T. mongolica Soós, 1977^{c g}
- T. namibensis Cogan, 1977^{c g}
- T. nigra Cogan, 1971^{c g}
- T. nigrifemorata (Bezzi, 1908)^{c g}
- T. nigritarsa Soós, 1977^{c g}
- T. nitidiventris (Melander, 1952)^{i c g}
- T. nubila Cogan, 1971^{c g}
- T. nuda (Coquillett, 1910)^{c g}
- T. obscurella (Fallén, 1823)^{c g}
- T. ornata (Johnson, 1895)^{c g}
- T. pallida Cogan, 1971^{c g}
- T. paraproxima Soós, 1979^{c g}
- T. pedestris (Loew, 1865)^{c g}
- T. peregrina Cogan, 1971^{c g}
- T. phylacis Séguy, 1953^{c g}
- T. plebs (Melander, 1952)^{i c g}
- T. polita (Malloch, 1931)^{b}
- T. problematica Cogan, 1971^{c g}
- T. proxima (Séguy, 1936)^{c g}
- T. psammophila Hackman, 1970^{c g}
- T. puncticornis (Becker, 1907)^{c g}
- T. punctifera (Bezzi, 1908)^{c g}
- T. pygochroa (Melander, 1952)^{i c g}
- T. sabinaevae Carles-Tolra, 1993^{c g}
- T. sabulicola (Frey, 1958)^{c g}
- T. sagulata (Melander, 1952)^{i c g}
- T. sanctiferdinandi (Czerny, 1909)^{c g}
- T. serpens Carles-Tolra, 2001^{c g}
- T. sexlineata Frey, 1949^{c g}
- T. signifera (Melander, 1952)^{i c g b}
- T. similis Hackman, 1970^{c g}
- T. stuckenbergi Cogan, 1971^{c g}
- T. stukei Woźnica, 2009^{c g}
- T. subobscura Cogan, 1971^{c g}
- T. suffusa (Melander, 1952)^{i c g}
- T. triplex (Melander, 1952)^{i c g}
- T. tumida (Melander, 1952)^{i c g}
- T. uniformis Cogan, 1971^{c g}
- T. vanharteni Woźnica, 2009^{c g}
- T. vikhrevi Woźnica, 2007^{c g}
- T. yugoslavensis (Bequaert, 1960)^{g}

Data sources: i = ITIS, c = Catalogue of Life, g = GBIF, b = Bugguide.net
