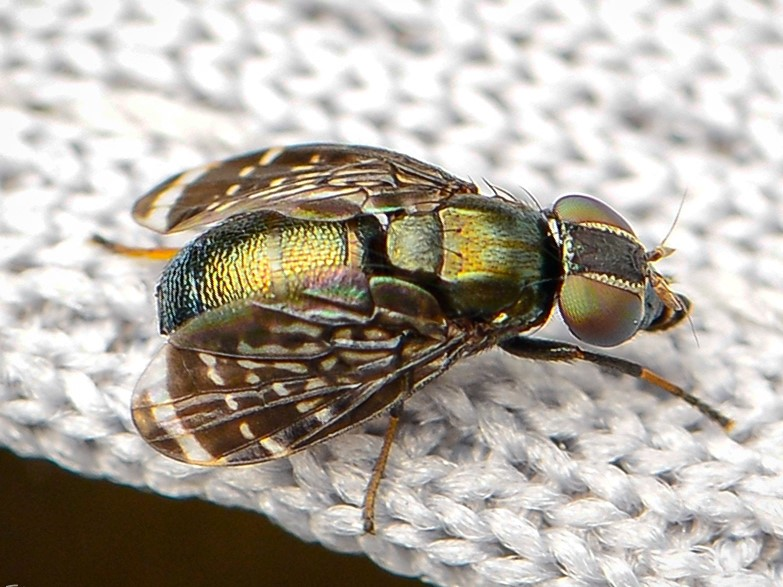

Scientific classification
- Domain: Eukaryota
- Kingdom: Animalia
- Phylum: Arthropoda
- Class: Insecta
- Order: Diptera
- Family: Platystomatidae
- Subfamily: Platystomatinae
- Genus: Amphicnephes
- Species: A. pullus

Binomial name
- Amphicnephes pullus (Wiedemann, 1830)

Synonyms
- Amphicnephes pertusus Loew, 1873; Trypeta pullus Wiedemann, 1830

= Amphicnephes pullus =

Species of fly

Amphicnephes pullus is a species of signal fly in the family Platystomatidae.
