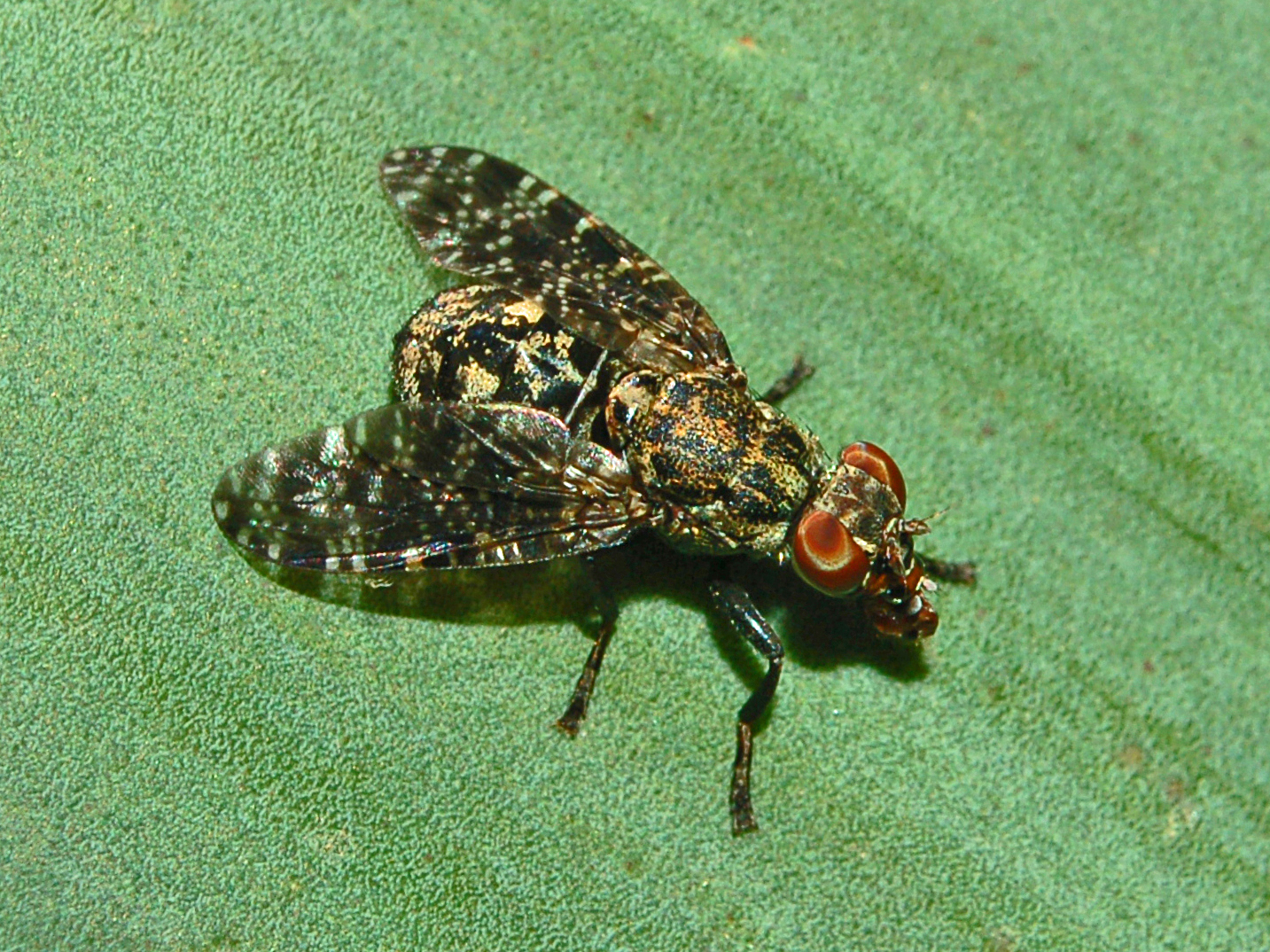
- Platystoma lugubre
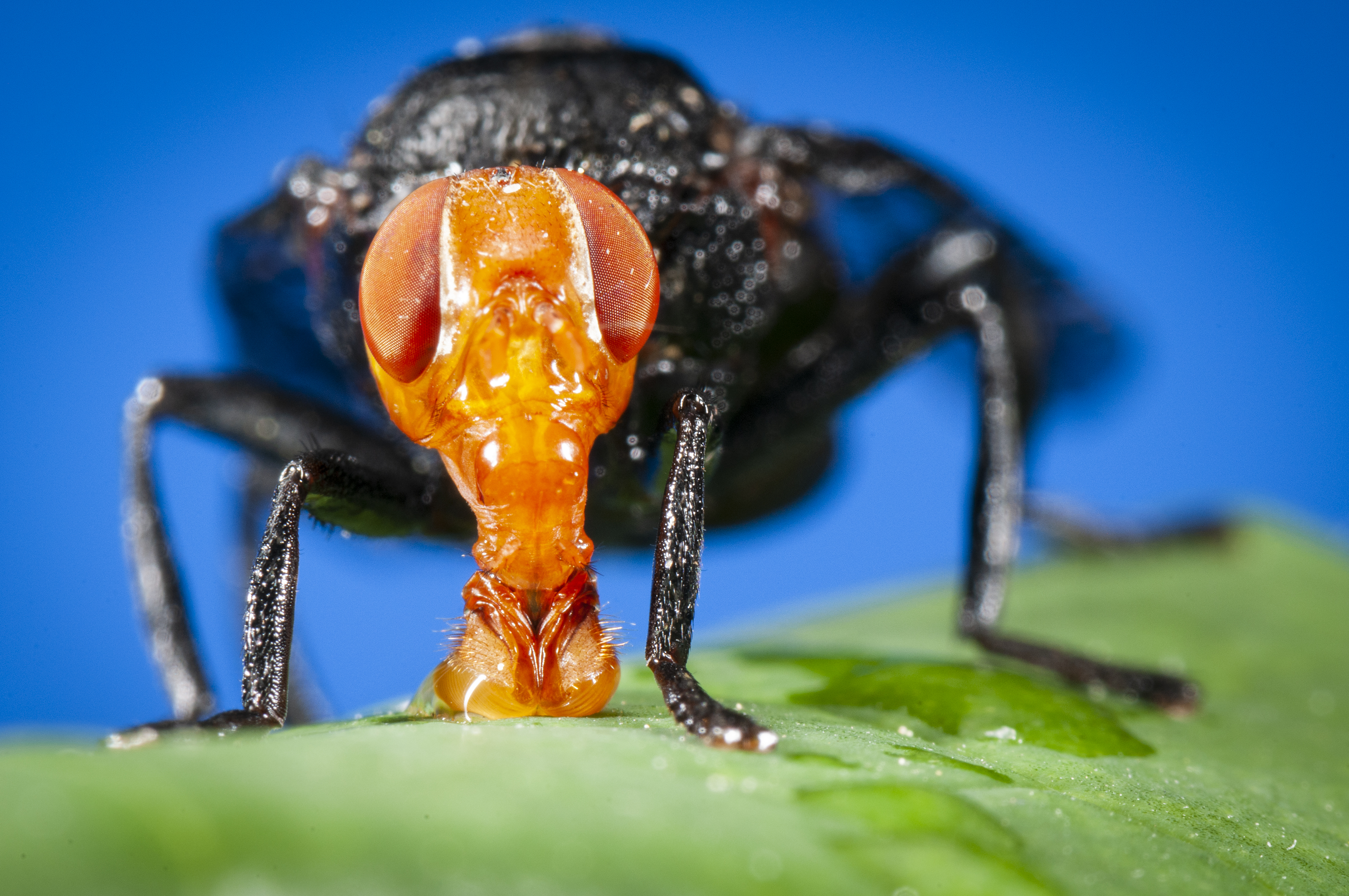
- Prosthiochaeta bifasciata Hara, 1987, Adult, South Korea

Scientific classification
- Kingdom: Animalia
- Phylum: Arthropoda
- Clade: Pancrustacea
- Class: Insecta
- Order: Diptera
- Family: Platystomatidae
- Subfamily: Platystomatinae; Schiner, 1862

= Platystomatinae =

Subfamily of flies

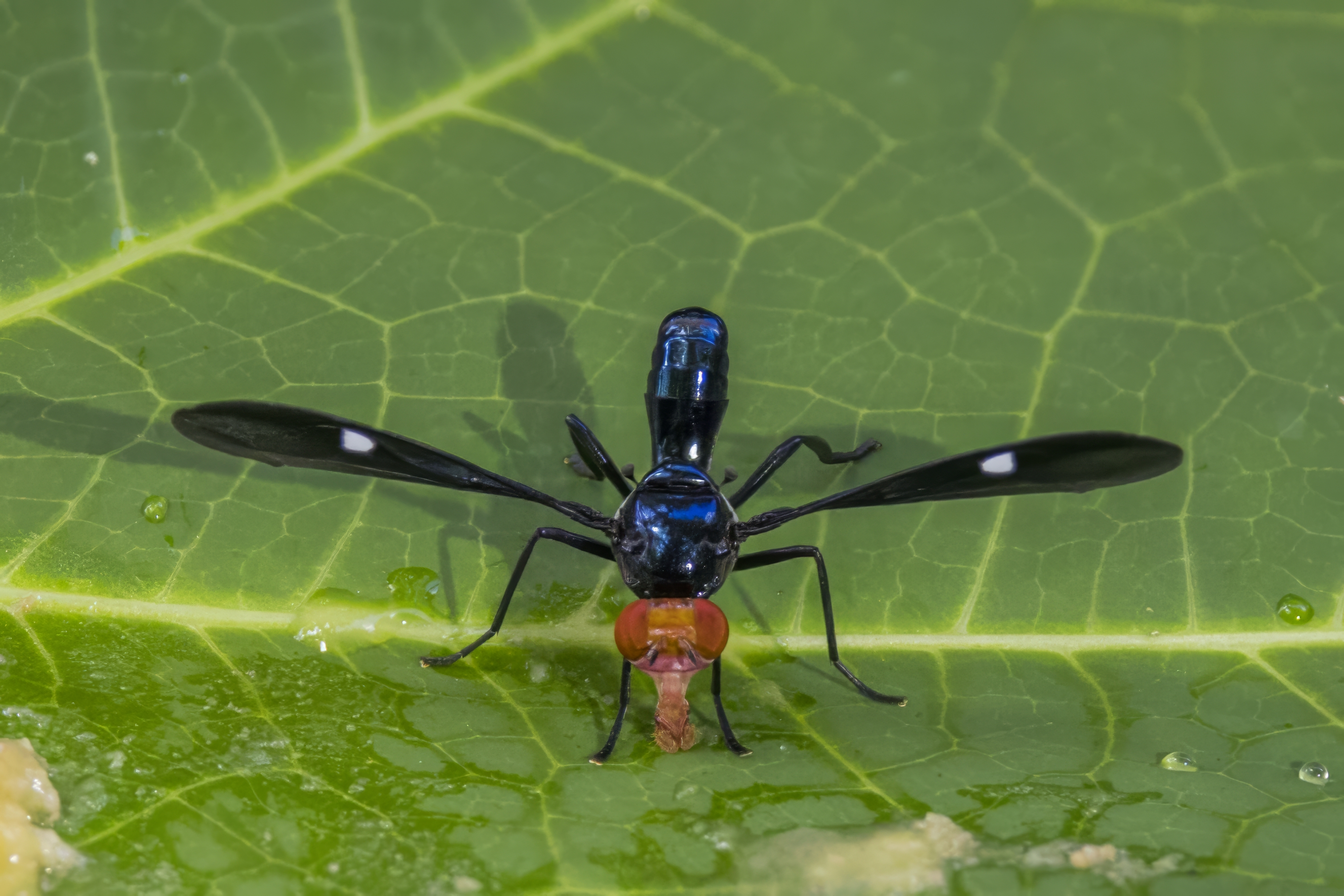
Clitodoca fenestralis, Ghana

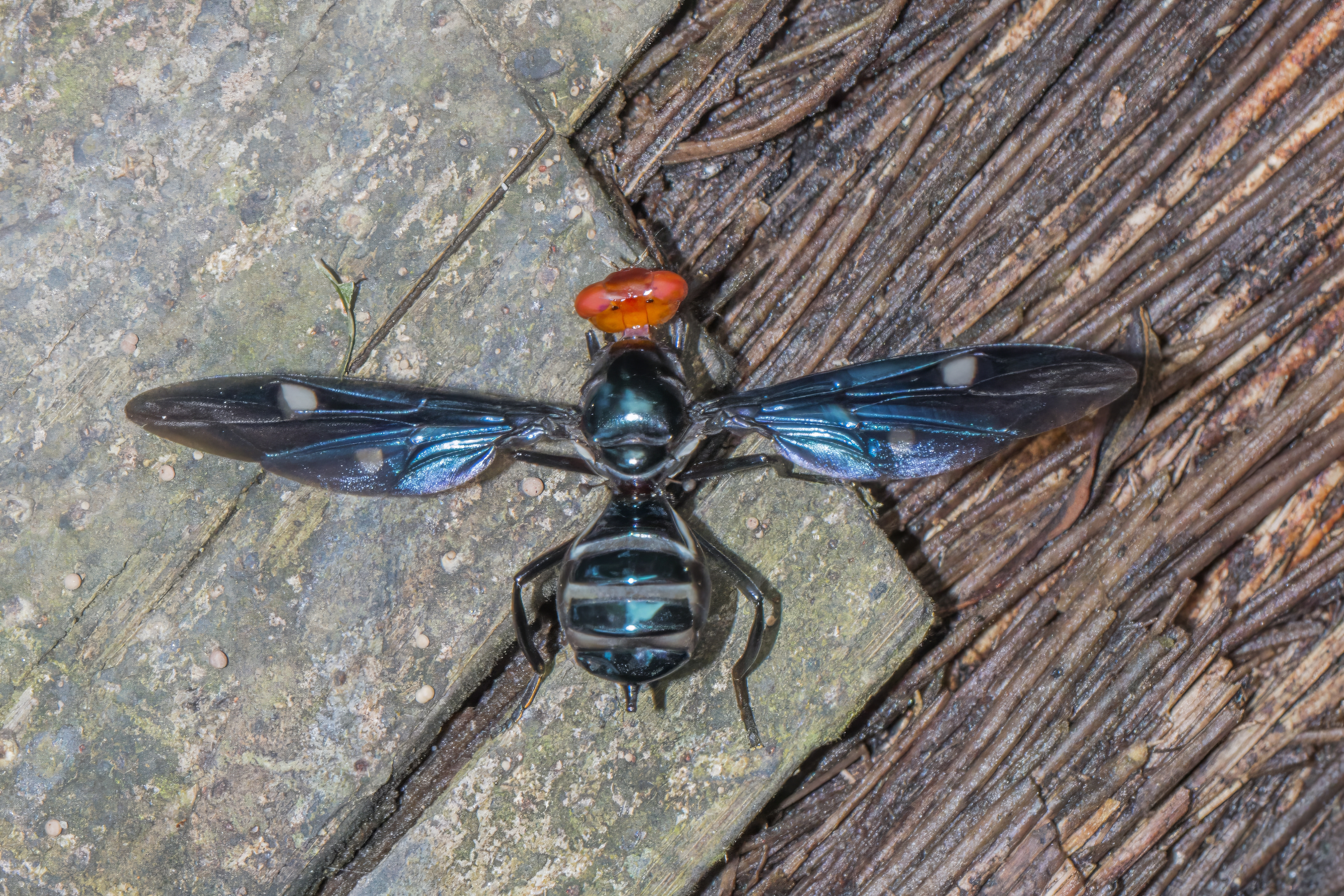
Clitodoca fenestralis, Ghana

Platystomatinae is a subfamily of flies (Diptera) in the family Platystomatidae (Signal flies) that includes 80 genera, the largest subfamily with at last estimate, c. 900 species globally.

== Subfamily classification ==
The Platystomatidae were comprehensively divided into five subfamilies, but more recent reviews of morphology suggest that some aspects of this classification are unsatisfactory. This led to reducing the number of subfamilies to four, being the Plastotephritinae, Platystomatinae, Scholastinae and Trapherinae – Angitulinae being subsumed into Platystomatinae. The most relevant diagnostic characters include: both the upper and lower calypters form a distinct lobe (in some genera these are equally undeveloped); the katepisternal setae absent; tergite 5 is well-developed; elongate terminal filaments on the sclerotised glans of the male distiphallus, each terminating in a gonopore.

== Biology ==
Members of the family Platystomatidae tend to occur in forest and forest margin habitat types, preferring shaded, densely-vegetated locations, while a few known from grassland or agricultural environments, sand dunes and other vegetation types. Adults of some genera can be found resting on the underside of foliage, while others utilise cryptic colouration and speckled wing patterns to escape detection on bark or rock surfaces.

Adults may be attracted to malodorous substances and decay, faeces, sap runs, decaying fruit, decaying snails and even human sweat in the case of Lamprogaster Macquart and Rivellia Robineau-Desvoidy.

Larvae are found on fresh and decaying vegetation, fruit, sugar cane, maize, coconuts, tree sap, carrion, human corpses, and root nodules, particularly in the genus Rivellia, which has economic implications for legume crops. There is a record in the Australian Museum (Sydney) of larvae of the genus Elassogaster attacking eggs capsules of migratory locust (Locusta migratoria).

== Biogeography ==
The largest concentration of Platystomatinae undoubtedly occurs in the Australasian region, followed closely by the Afrotropical region. The number of genera and species in the Oriental, European, Nearctic and Neotropical faunas are much more restricted.

Some genera are widely distributed over more than one region. For example, Plagiostenopterina Hendel, 1912, is widely distributed in the Old World tropics (Australasian, Oriental and Afrotropical regions) and Rivellia Robineau-Desvoidy, 1830 is almost cosmopolitan, although numbers of species in Europe are very restricted. Taxonomic revisions on such genera need to examine the wider implications of these broad distributions. Other genera a known from just a single location. Bama McAlpine, 2001, for example, is known only from New Guinea.

== Genera ==
- Achias Fabricius, 1805
- Aetha McAlpine, 2001
- Amphicnephes Loew, 1873
- Angelopteromyia Korneyev, 2001
- Angitula Walker, 1859
- Antineura Osten-Sacken, 1881
- Apactoneura Malloch, 1930
- Bama McAlpine, 2001
- Brea Walker, 1859
- Bromophila Loew, 1873
- Carolimyia Malloch, 1931
- Cleitamia Macquart, 1835
- Cleitamoides Malloch, 1939
- Clitodoca Loew, 1873
- Coelocephala Karsch, 1888
- Conicipithea Hendel, 1912
- Dayomyia McAlpine, 2007
- Duomyia Walker, 1849
- Elassogaster Bigot, 1860
- Engistoneura Loew, 1873
- Eosamphicnephes Frey, 1932
- Eumeka McAlpine, 2001
- Euprosopia Macquart, 1847
- Euthyplatystoma Hendel, 1914
- Euxestomoea de Meijere, 1913
- Himeroessa Loew, 1873
- Hysma McAlpine, 2001
- Icteracantha Hendel, 1912
- Imugana Enderlein, 1937
- Inium McAlpine, 1995
- Laglaisia Bigot, 1878
- Lambia Hendel, 1912
- Lamprogaster Macquart, 1843
- Lamprophthalma Portschinsky, 1892
- Lophoplatystoma Hendel, 1914
- Loxoceromyia Hendel, 1914
- Loxoneura Macquart, 1835
- Loxoneuroides Hendel, 1914
- Lulodes Enderlein, 1924
- Meringomeria Enderlein, 1924
- Metoposparga Enderlein, 1924
- Mezona Speiser, 1914
- Microepicausta Hendel, 1914
- Mindanaia Malloch, 1931
- Montrouziera Bigot, 1860
- Neoardelio Hendel, 1914
- Neoepidesma Hendel, 1914
- Oedemachilus Bigot, 1860
- Palpomya Robineau-Desvoidy, 1830
- Par McAlpine, 2001
- Peltacanthina Enderlein, 1912
- Peronotrochus Enderlein, 1924
- Philocompus Osten-Sacken, 1881
- Phlebophis Frey, 1932
- Phytalmodes Bezzi, 1908
- Picrometopus Frey, 1932
- Plagiostenopterina Hendel, 1912
- Platystoma Meigen, 1803
- Pogonortalis Hendel in de Meijere, 1911
- Polystodes Robineau-Desvoidy, 1830
- Prosthiochaeta Hara, 1987
- Prosthiochaeta Enderlein, 1924
- Pseudepicausta Hendel, 1914
- Pseudocleitamia Malloch, 1939
- Pseudorichardia Hendel, 1911
- Rhytidortalis Hendel, 1914
- Rivellia Robineau-Desvoidy, 1830
- Scelostenopterina Hendel, 1914
- Scotinosoma Loew, 1873
- Senopterina Macquart, 1835
- Signa McAlpine, 2001
- Sors McAlpine, 2007
- Sphenoprosopa Loew, 1873
- Steyskaliella Soós, 1978
- Tarfa McAlpine, 2001
- Terzia McAlpine, 2001
- Valonia Walker, 1856
- Xenaspis Osten-Sacken, 1881
- Xenaspoides Frey, 1930
- Zealandortalis Malloch, 1939
