= Plastotephritinae =

- Oeciotypa hendeli Lindner, 1957

Scientific classification
- Domain: Eukaryota
- Kingdom: Animalia
- Phylum: Arthropoda
- Class: Insecta
- Order: Diptera
- Family: Platystomatidae
- Subfamily: Plastotephritinae; Enderlein, 1922

Subfamily of flies

Plastotephritinae is a subfamily of flies (Diptera) in the family Platystomatidae (Signal flies), which currently includes 18 genera.

== Subfamily classification ==
The Platystomatidae were comprehensively divided into five subfamilies, but more recent reviews of morphology suggest that some aspects of this classification are unsatisfactory. This led to reducing the number of subfamilies to four, being the Plastotephritinae, Platystomatinae, Scholastinae and Trapherinae - Angitulinae being subsumed into Platystomatinae.

Nonetheless, definition of the subfamily Plastotephritinae is still open to debate and requires phylogenetic confirmation. At present, genera assigned to the subfamily are considered as having the following subset of characters: an evanescent subcostal vein, reduced lower calypter, tergites 4 and 5 much shorter than tergite 3, distiphallus terminating at the glans (i.e. no terminal filaments) and tergite 6 in the female abdomen absent or vestigial. The head morphology of the subfamily is exceptional and variable including 9 different types of modification in 16 genera.

Four of the 18 genera in the Plastotephritinae are monotypic: Eudasys, Micronesomyia, Prosopoconus, and Rhegmatosaga.

== Biology ==
Little is known of the biology of plastotephritines. The complex mating behaviour observed in the family Platystomatidae as a whole, and for which the name Signal flies has been bestowed on them, is also observed in Plastotephritinae, which utilize elaborate displays of the wings and face-to-face stand-offs during the process of mate selection. Many species have elaborated morphological modification to the head capsule (laterally extended gena, or "cheeks", for example, and eye stalks) to enhance agonistic behaviour. Habitats in which they are encountered range from rainforest to montane forest, woodland, bush, riparian and swamp habitats, lowland savannah, dry river beds. Larvae have not been reared and adult-plant associations are little indication of breeding sites. Nonetheless, the family Platystomatidae as a whole tend to be attracted to flowers, decaying fruit, excrement, sweat, and decomposing snails, with the larvae are found on fresh and decaying vegetation, carrion, human corpses - there is no reason to suppose the members of Plastotephritinae will differ. So far adults have been recorded on plants of Zea maize Zea, Prange afranjonum, Macaranga hurifolia Macaranga, and on fruit of Annona Annona (custard apple), Syzygium_jambos Syzygium jambos (rose apple) and Mangifera indica Mangifera indica (mango).

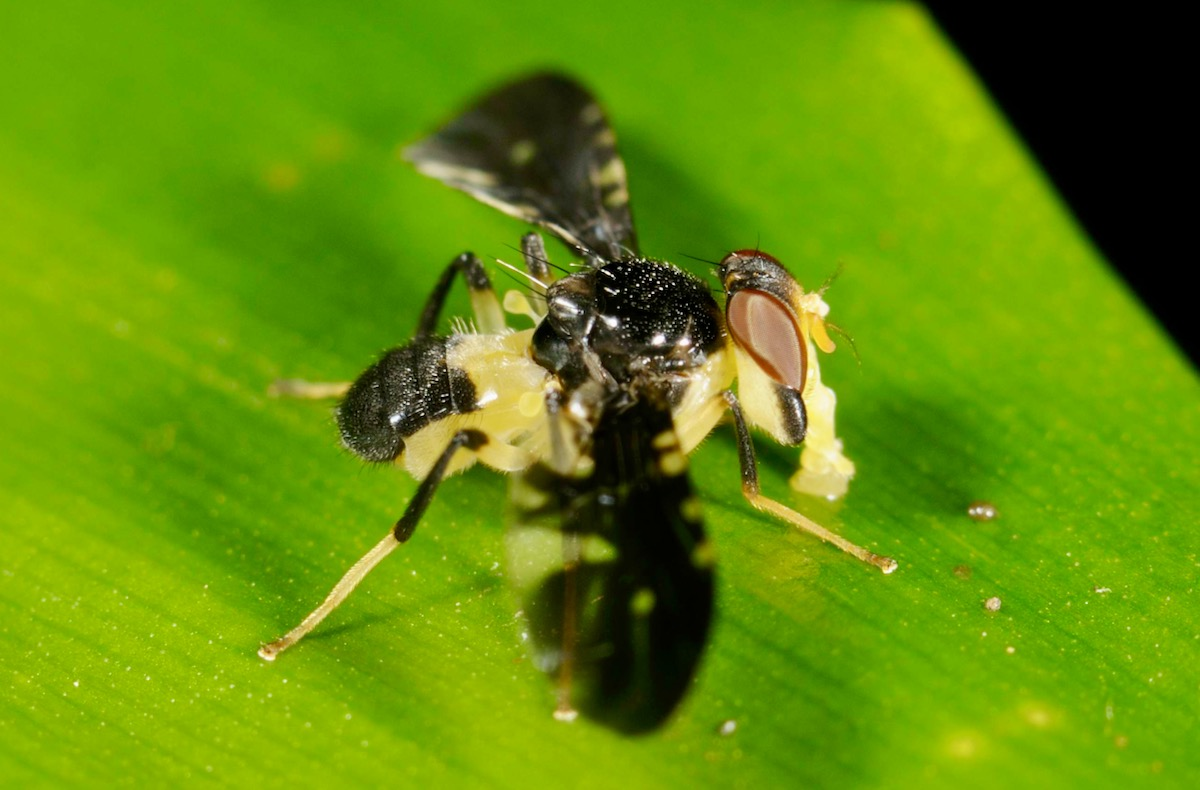
Conopariella tibialis

== Biogeography ==
The largest concentration of plastotephritine species occurs in the Afrotropical region, with only Agadasys and Rhegmatosaga known from the Oriental region - and then from few species and few specimens. Material from the Pacific Islands, New Guinea and Australia are yet to be revised and fully assessed, but the most recent assessments of these faunas suggest that species and genera previously assigned to the subfamily may not belong there. Within the Afrotropical context, the distribution is mainly tropical to subtropical, predominantly in West, Central and East Africa, with minor elements in southern Africa and Madagascar. None are known to exist on the other Indian Ocean islands. There is a strong preference for forest and riverine habitats.

== Taxonomic history ==
Richard Frey published one of the long lasting attempts at providing full family status Platystomatidae, and subfamily divisions within it. Despite that some of the subfamilies he proposed have now been sunk back into Platystomatinae, his use of Plastotephritinae in particular has been long lasting. In 1932 Frey attributed the name Plastotephritinae to Enderlein, although Enderlein treated the group at tribal level (hence Plastotephritini Enderlein, 1922). The correct stem for Plastotephritinae, based on Tephritis Latrille, 1804, is Plastotephritidinae and common usage of the shorter stem (Plastotephritinae and Plastotephritini) has prevailed and is used here following the decision of Sabrosky (1999).

== Genera ==
- Agadasys Whittington, 2000
- Agrochira Enderlein, 1922
- Atopocnema Enderlein, 1922
- Cladoderris Bezzi, 1914
- Conopariella Enderlein, 1922
- Eudasys Whittington, 2003
- Federleyella Frey, 1932
- Furcamyia Whittington, 2003
- Mesanopin Enderlein, 1912
- Micronesomyia Whittington, 2003
- Oeciotypa Hendel, 1914
- Plastotephritis Enderlein, 1922
- Prosopoconus Enderlein, 1922
- Pterogenomyia Hendel, 1914
- Rhegmatosaga Frey, 1930
- Stellapteryx Whittington, 2003
- Venacalva Whittington, 2003
- Xyrogena Whittington, 2003
