= Rivellia quadrifasciata =

Scientific classification
- Domain: Eukaryota
- Kingdom: Animalia
- Phylum: Arthropoda
- Class: Insecta
- Order: Diptera
- Family: Platystomatidae
- Genus: Rivellia
- Species: R. quadrifasciata

Binomial name
- Rivellia quadrifasciata (Macquart, 1835)

Species of insect

Rivellia quadrifasciata, the soybean nodule fly, is a species of signal flies (insects in the family Platystomatidae). Larvae are known to feed on Glycine max, Phaseolus limensi, Vigna unguiculata, and Desmodium plants.
