= Rivellia micans =

Scientific classification
- Domain: Eukaryota
- Kingdom: Animalia
- Phylum: Arthropoda
- Class: Insecta
- Order: Diptera
- Family: Platystomatidae
- Genus: Rivellia
- Species: R. micans

Binomial name
- Rivellia micans Loew, 1873

Species of fly

Rivellia micans is a species of signal flies (insects in the family Platystomatidae).
