= Trixoscelis approximata =

Scientific classification
- Kingdom: Animalia
- Phylum: Arthropoda
- Class: Insecta
- Order: Diptera
- Family: Heleomyzidae
- Genus: Trixoscelis
- Species: T. approximata

Binomial name
- Trixoscelis approximata (Loew, 1865)

Synonyms
- Geomyza approximata (Loew, 1865)

Species of fly

Trixoscelis approximata is a European species of Heleomyzidae.
