= Trixoscelis lyneborgi =

Scientific classification
- Kingdom: Animalia
- Phylum: Arthropoda
- Class: Insecta
- Order: Diptera
- Family: Heleomyzidae
- Genus: Trixoscelis
- Species: T. lyneborgi

Binomial name
- Trixoscelis lyneborgi Hackman, 1970

Species of fly

Trixoscelis lyneborgi, is a European species of Heleomyzidae.
