= Rivellia cognata =

Scientific classification
- Domain: Eukaryota
- Kingdom: Animalia
- Phylum: Arthropoda
- Class: Insecta
- Order: Diptera
- Family: Platystomatidae
- Genus: Rivellia
- Species: R. cognata

Binomial name
- Rivellia cognata Cresson, 1919

Species of fly

Rivellia cognata is a species of signal flies (insects in the family Platystomatidae).
