= Rivellia quadrivittata =

Scientific classification
- Kingdom: Animalia
- Phylum: Arthropoda
- Class: Insecta
- Order: Diptera
- Family: Platystomatidae
- Genus: Rivellia
- Species: R. quadrivittata

Binomial name
- Rivellia quadrivittata (Macquart, 1844)

Synonyms
- Ceroxys quadrivittata Macquart, 1844

Species of fly

Rivellia quadrivittata is a species of fly in the genus Rivellia of the family Platystomatidae.
