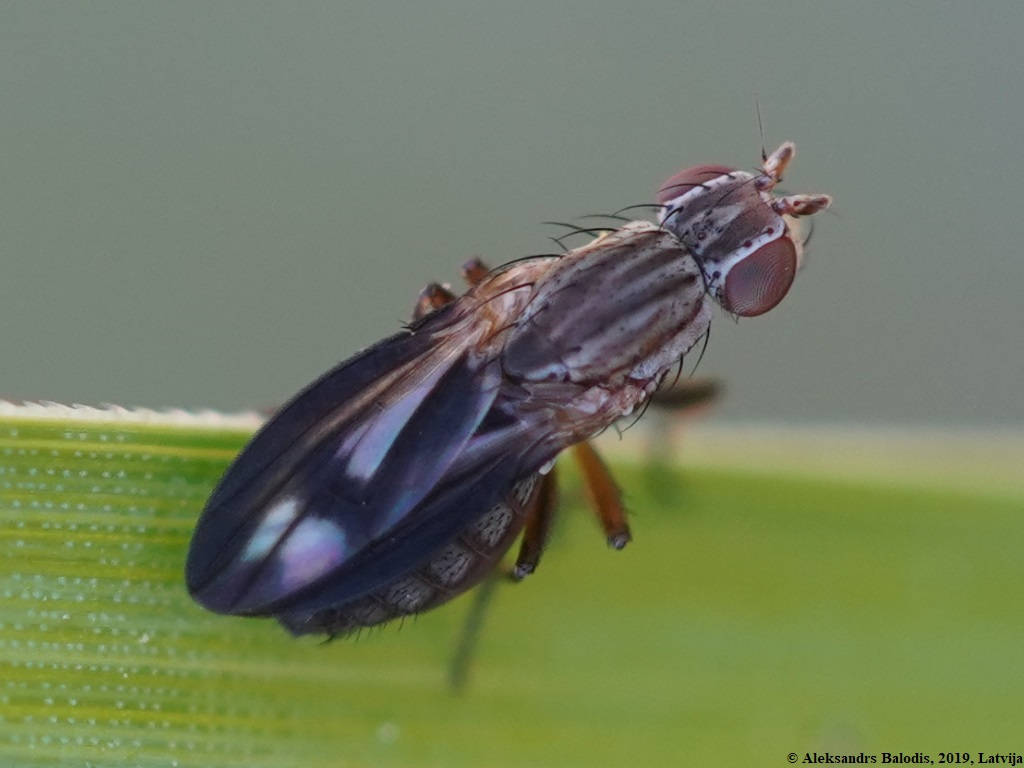

Scientific classification
- Kingdom: Animalia
- Phylum: Arthropoda
- Class: Insecta
- Order: Diptera
- Family: Heleomyzidae
- Genus: Trixoscelis
- Species: T. marginella

Binomial name
- Trixoscelis marginella (Fallén, 1823)

Synonyms
- Geomyza marginella Fallén, 1823

= Trixoscelis marginella =

Species of fly

Trixoscelis marginella, is a European species of Heleomyzidae.
