= Trixoscelis canescens =

Scientific classification
- Kingdom: Animalia
- Phylum: Arthropoda
- Class: Insecta
- Order: Diptera
- Family: Heleomyzidae
- Genus: Trixoscelis
- Species: T. canescens

Binomial name
- Trixoscelis canescens (Loew, 1865)

Synonyms
- Geomyza canescens Loew, 1865

Species of fly

Trixoscelis canescens, is a European species of Heleomyzidae.
