= Senopterina varia =

Scientific classification
- Domain: Eukaryota
- Kingdom: Animalia
- Phylum: Arthropoda
- Class: Insecta
- Order: Diptera
- Family: Platystomatidae
- Genus: Senopterina
- Species: S. varia

Binomial name
- Senopterina varia Coquillett, 1900

Synonyms
- Senopterina bicolor Johnson, 1900

Species of fly

Senopterina varia is a species of signal flies (insects in the family Platystomatidae).
