= Senopterina caerulescens =

Scientific classification
- Domain: Eukaryota
- Kingdom: Animalia
- Phylum: Arthropoda
- Class: Insecta
- Order: Diptera
- Family: Platystomatidae
- Genus: Senopterina
- Species: S. caerulescens

Binomial name
- Senopterina caerulescens Loew, 1873

Species of fly

Senopterina caerulescens is a species of signal flies (insects in the family Platystomatidae).
