= Rivellia steyskali =

Scientific classification
- Domain: Eukaryota
- Kingdom: Animalia
- Phylum: Arthropoda
- Class: Insecta
- Order: Diptera
- Family: Platystomatidae
- Genus: Rivellia
- Species: R. steyskali

Binomial name
- Rivellia steyskali Namba, 1956

Species of fly

Rivellia steyskali is a species of signal flies (insects in the family Platystomatidae).
