= Rivellia occulta =

Scientific classification
- Domain: Eukaryota
- Kingdom: Animalia
- Phylum: Arthropoda
- Class: Insecta
- Order: Diptera
- Family: Platystomatidae
- Genus: Rivellia
- Species: R. occulta

Binomial name
- Rivellia occulta Wulp, 1898

Species of fly

Rivellia occulta is a species of signal flies (insects in the family Platystomatidae).
