= Trixoscelis flavida =

Scientific classification
- Domain: Eukaryota
- Kingdom: Animalia
- Phylum: Arthropoda
- Class: Insecta
- Order: Diptera
- Family: Heleomyzidae
- Genus: Trixoscelis
- Species: T. flavida

Binomial name
- Trixoscelis flavida (Melander, 1952)

Synonyms
- Trixoselis flavida Melander, 1952

Species of fly

Trixoscelis flavida is a species of fly in the family Heleomyzidae.
