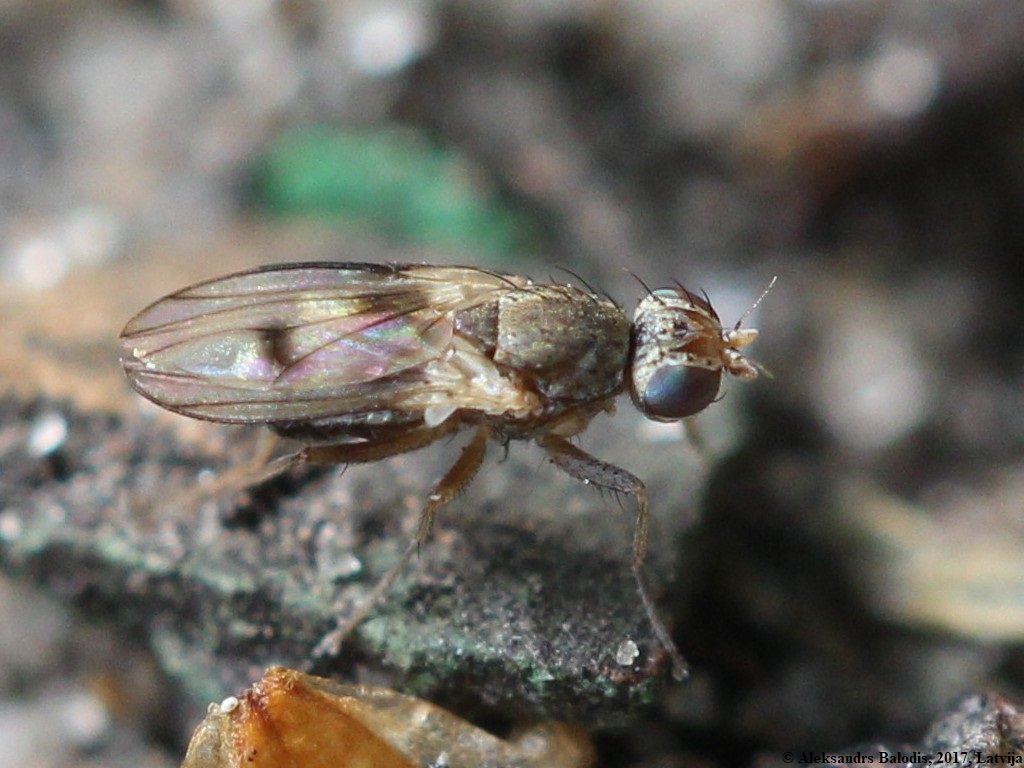

Scientific classification
- Kingdom: Animalia
- Phylum: Arthropoda
- Class: Insecta
- Order: Diptera
- Family: Heleomyzidae
- Genus: Trixoscelis
- Species: T. obscurella

Binomial name
- Trixoscelis obscurella (Fallén, 1823)

Synonyms
- Geomyza obscurella Fallén, 1823; Helomyza arenaria Haliday, 1838; Helomyza arenaria Haliday, 1837; Trixoscelis arenaria (Haliday, 1838); Trixoscelis arenaria (Haliday, 1837)

= Trixoscelis obscurella =

Species of fly

Trixoscelis obscurella is a European species of Heleomyzidae.
