= Trixoscelis signifera =

Scientific classification
- Domain: Eukaryota
- Kingdom: Animalia
- Phylum: Arthropoda
- Class: Insecta
- Order: Diptera
- Family: Heleomyzidae
- Genus: Trixoscelis
- Species: T. signifera

Binomial name
- Trixoscelis signifera (Melander, 1952)

Synonyms
- Trixoselis signifera Melander, 1952

Species of fly

Trixoscelis signifera is a species of fly in the family Heleomyzidae.
