= Rivellia winifredae =

Scientific classification
- Domain: Eukaryota
- Kingdom: Animalia
- Phylum: Arthropoda
- Class: Insecta
- Order: Diptera
- Family: Platystomatidae
- Genus: Rivellia
- Species: R. winifredae

Binomial name
- Rivellia winifredae Namba, 1956

Species of fly

Rivellia winifredae is a species of signal flies (insects in the family Platystomatidae). It is found associated with Apios americana.
