= Rivellia metallica =

Scientific classification
- Domain: Eukaryota
- Kingdom: Animalia
- Phylum: Arthropoda
- Class: Insecta
- Order: Diptera
- Family: Platystomatidae
- Genus: Rivellia
- Species: R. metallica

Binomial name
- Rivellia metallica (Wulp, 1867)

Synonyms
- Herina metallica Wulp, 1867

Species of fly

Rivellia metallica is a species of signal flies (insects in the family Platystomatidae).
