= Rivellia coquilletti =

Scientific classification
- Domain: Eukaryota
- Kingdom: Animalia
- Phylum: Arthropoda
- Class: Insecta
- Order: Diptera
- Family: Platystomatidae
- Genus: Rivellia
- Species: R. coquilletti

Binomial name
- Rivellia coquilletti Hendel, 1914

Synonyms
- Rivellia basilaris Coquillett, 1900

Species of fly

Rivellia coquilletti is a species of signal flies (insects in the family Platystomatidae).
