= Rivellia conjuncta =

Scientific classification
- Kingdom: Animalia
- Phylum: Arthropoda
- Clade: Pancrustacea
- Class: Insecta
- Order: Diptera
- Family: Platystomatidae
- Genus: Rivellia
- Species: R. conjuncta

Binomial name
- Rivellia conjuncta Loew, 1873

Species of fly

Rivellia conjuncta is a species of signal flies (insects in the family Platystomatidae).
