= Rivellia interrupta =

Scientific classification
- Domain: Eukaryota
- Kingdom: Animalia
- Phylum: Arthropoda
- Class: Insecta
- Order: Diptera
- Family: Platystomatidae
- Genus: Rivellia
- Species: R. interrupta

Binomial name
- Rivellia interrupta (Macquart, 1835)

Synonyms
- Urophora interrupta Macquart, 1835

Species of fly

Rivellia interrupta is a species of tephritid or fruit flies in the genus Rivellia of the family Tephritidae.
