= Trixoscelis psammophila =

Scientific classification
- Kingdom: Animalia
- Phylum: Arthropoda
- Class: Insecta
- Order: Diptera
- Family: Heleomyzidae
- Genus: Trixoscelis
- Species: T. psammophila

Binomial name
- Trixoscelis psammophila Hackman, 1970

Species of fly

Trixoscelis psammophila is a European species of Heleomyzidae, which is a small family of flies.
