= Li Binzhu =

Chinese-Austrian judge and politician

Li Binzhu (simplified Chinese: 李滨珠; traditional Chinese: 李濱珠; pinyin: Lǐ Bīnzhū; 8 November 1921 – 12 July 2007) was a Chinese-Austrian judge and politician. She was a long-time fighter in the war of the Second Sino-Japanese War. She developed a school model for literacy of rural women. In 1945, she married Austrian physician Richard Frey, an antifascist fighter in Yan'an. In the period of the civil war and after the founding of the People's Republic of China she worked as a judge, later as a process leader and as a commissioner in the People's Procuratorate. In 1958 she and her husband had to give up their posts for political reasons. She then worked as a principal in a high school and became a critic of the political movements Anti-Rightist Campaign and Great Leap Forward. In 1959, under political pressure, she finally had to annul her marriage and raise her three children on her own. After overcoming a severe depression, she worked until her retirement in 1982 as a party secretary in the clothing industry. She died in 2007 in Vienna.
