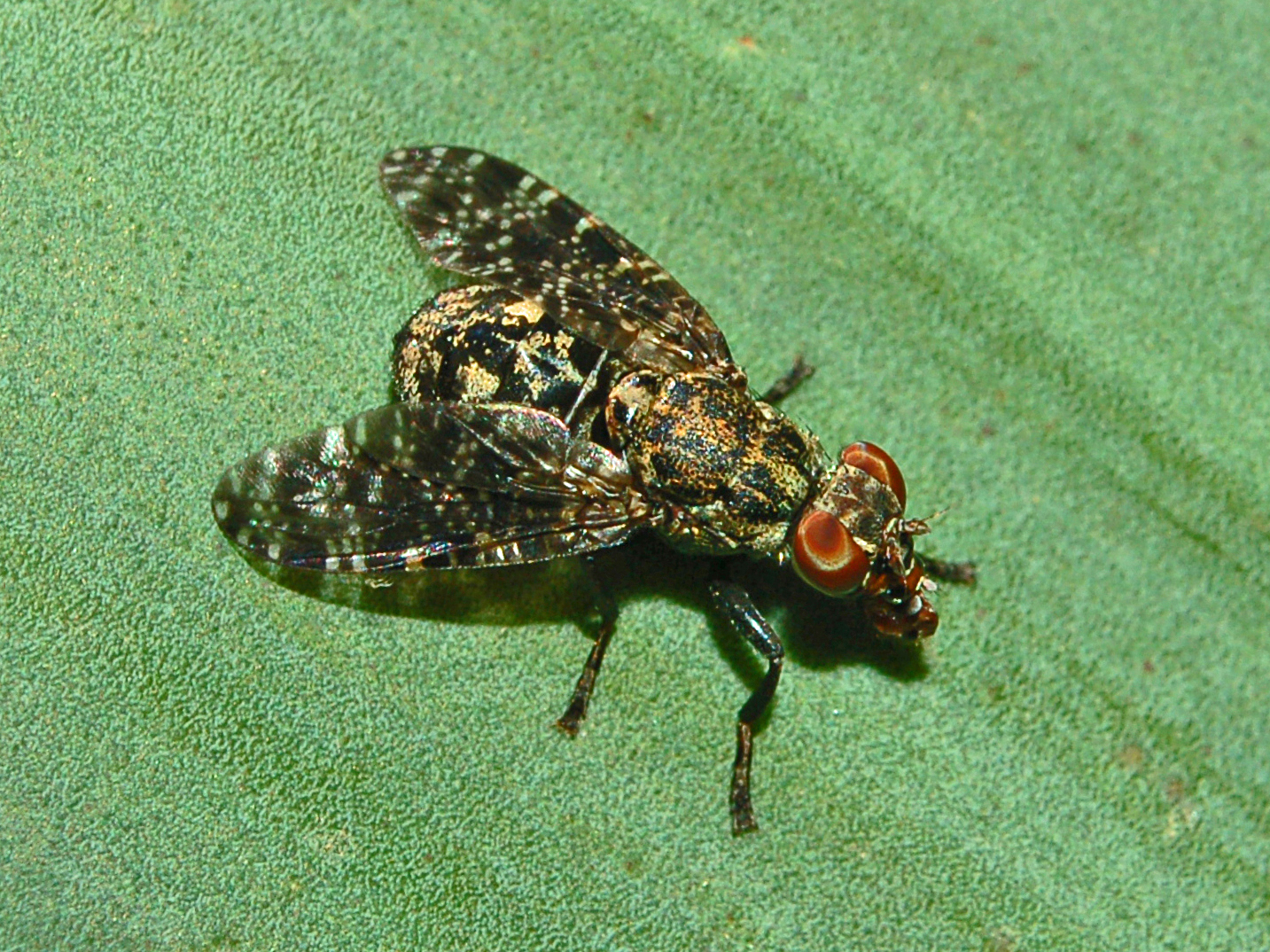
- Platystoma lugubre

Scientific classification
- Kingdom: Animalia
- Phylum: Arthropoda
- Class: Insecta
- Order: Diptera
- Family: Platystomatidae
- Subfamily: Platystomatinae
- Genus: Platystoma; Meigen 1803

Type species
- Musca seminationis Fabricius, 1775

Synonyms
- Platistoma Guerin, 1831; Platistoma Lioy, 1864: Hesyquillia Robineau-Desvoidy, 1830

= Platystoma =

Genus of flies

Platystoma is a genus of flies (Diptera) belonging to the family Platystomatidae.

== Description ==
Platystoma species are small flies reaching a length of 4–10 millimeters. The body is black speckled with small whitish or yellowish markings, while the eyes are usually red. They have a quite broad proboscis (hence the Latin name Platystoma, meaning "broad mouth"). The wings are blackish with clear speckles. These flies show a complex mating ritual.

== Distribution ==
Species belonging to this genus are present in most of Europe, in the eastern Palearctic realm, in the Near East and in North Africa.

== Taxonomy ==
The genus is in need of revision to clarify the position of many subspecies that are currently listed. Most of these subspecies were designated by Hennig, but some have been raised to full species since. The list below incorporates those names more recently upgraded to species, but leaves the remainder of the subspecies designated by Hennig as subspecies until their position can be rectified by revision.

== Species ==
- P. aenescens Loew, 1868
- P. afghanistanicum Soós, 1977
- P. altaicum Soós, 1978
- P. arcuatum Loew, 1856
- P. bezzii Hendel, 1913
- P. bipilosum Portschinsky, 1875^{c g}
- P. canum Portschinsky, 1875^{c g}
- P. centralasiaticum Soós, 1978
- P. chrysotoxum Hendel, 1913
- P. clathratum Hendel, 1913
- P. corticarum (Rondani, 1869)
- P. curvinerve Hendel, 1913
- P. dimidiatum Hendel, 1913
- P. elegans Hendel, 1913
- P. euphorbiinum Enderlein, 1930
- P. gemmationis (Rondani, 1869)
- P. gilvipes Loew, 1868
- P. hendeli Lindner, 1941
- P. ilguenense Bischof, 1905^{c g}
- P. insularum (Rondani, 1869)
- P. kaszabi Soós, 1978
- P. lativentre Loew, 1866
- P. lugubre (Robineau-Desvoidy, 1830)
- P. malatiense Hennig, 1945
- P. mandschuricum Enderlein, 1937
- P. mendex Soós, 1978
- P. meridionale Hendel, 1913
- P. mongolicum Soós, 1978
- P. murinum Hendel, 1913
- P. nitidiventre Hendel, 1913
- P. obtusum Hendel, 1913
- P. oculatum Becker, 1907
- P. plantationis (Rondani, 1869)
- P. provinciale Loew, 1868
- P. pubescens Loew, 1845
- P. punctiventre Portschinsky, 1875
- P. rufipes Meigen, 1826
- P. seminationis (Fabricius, 1775)
- P. soosi Krivosheina & Krivosheina, 1996
- P. stackelbergi Soós, 1979
- P. strix Portschinsky, 1875
- P. suave Loew, 1873
- P. subfasciatum Loew, 1862
- P. subtile Loew, 1868
- P. tegularum Loew, 1859
- P. ussuricum Korneyev, 1991
