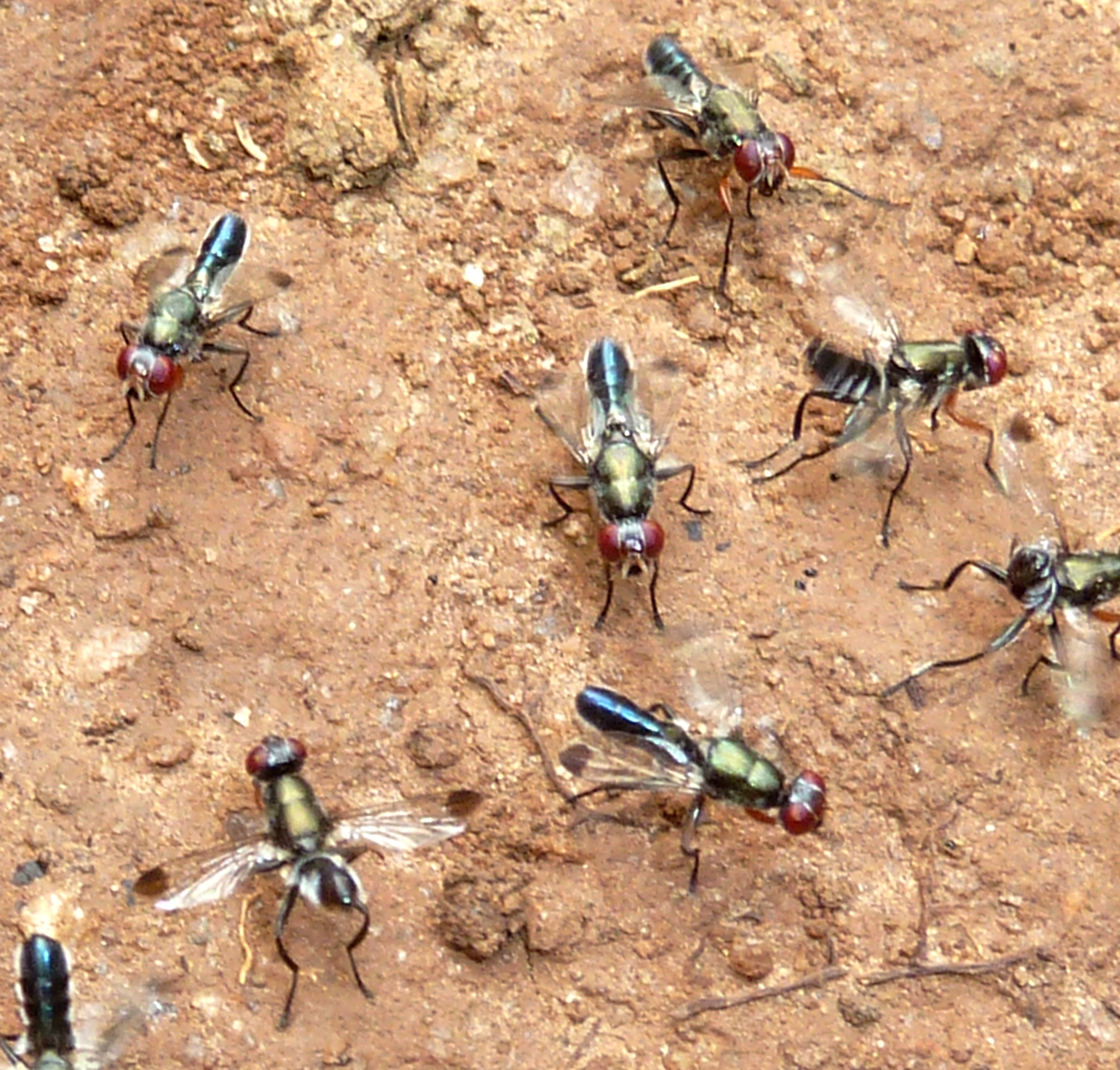
- Elassogaster sp. in South Africa

Scientific classification
- Kingdom: Animalia
- Phylum: Arthropoda
- Class: Insecta
- Order: Diptera
- Family: Platystomatidae
- Subfamily: Platystomatinae
- Genus: Elassogaster; Bigot, 1860

Type species
- Elassogaster metallica Bigot, 1860

Synonyms
- Epicausta Loew, 1873; Myiodella Rondani, 1873

= Elassogaster =

Genus of flies

Elassogaster is a genus of scavenger flies (Diptera) belonging to the family Platystomatidae. They are native to warm regions of Africa, Madagascar, Asia and Australia.

They have rounded heads with red eyes, a shiny green thorax and a dark stigma on the wing tips. Adults frequent the vicinity of dung or carcasses, where they walk while constantly waving their wings. The larvae develop in dung.

== Species ==
- E. aerea Hendel, 1914
- E. anteapicalis Hendel, 1914
- E. arcuata Hendel, 1914
- E. brachialis (Rondani, 1873)
- E. calida (Wiedemann, 1830)
- E. didyma (Osten Sacken, 1881)
- E. didymoides Hendel, 1914
- E. flavipes (Schiner, 1868)
- E. floresana Hennig, 1941
- E. hilgendorfi Enderlein, 1924
- E. hyalipennis Malloch, 1931
- E. immaculata (Macquart, 1843)
- E. inflexus (Fabricius, 1805)
- E. linearis (Walker, 1849)
- E. metallica Bigot, 1860
- E. nigripes Malloch, 1940
- E. potens Frey, 1930
- E. pulla Hendel, 1914
- E. quadrimaculata Hendel, 1914
- E. rutila (Hendel, 1914)
- E. sangiensis Meijere, 1916
- E. signatipes (Walker, 1860)
- E. simplex Frey, 1930
- E. sordida (Walker, 1861)
- E. vanderwulpi Hendel, 1914
