= Trixoscelis vikhrevi =

Scientific classification
- Kingdom: Animalia
- Phylum: Arthropoda
- Class: Insecta
- Order: Diptera
- Family: Heleomyzidae
- Genus: Trixoscelis
- Species: T. vikhrevi

Binomial name
- Trixoscelis vikhrevi Woźnica, 2007

Species of fly

Trixoscelis vikhrevi is a European species of Heleomyzidae.
