= Trixoscelis frontalis =

Scientific classification
- Kingdom: Animalia
- Phylum: Arthropoda
- Class: Insecta
- Order: Diptera
- Family: Heleomyzidae
- Genus: Trixoscelis
- Species: T. frontalis

Binomial name
- Trixoscelis frontalis (Fallén, 1823)

Synonyms
- Anthomyza frontalis Fallén, 1823; Ochthiphila nigrimana Meigen, 1830; Trixoscelis nigrimana (Meigen, 1830)

Species of fly

Trixoscelis frontalis, is a European species of Heleomyzidae.
