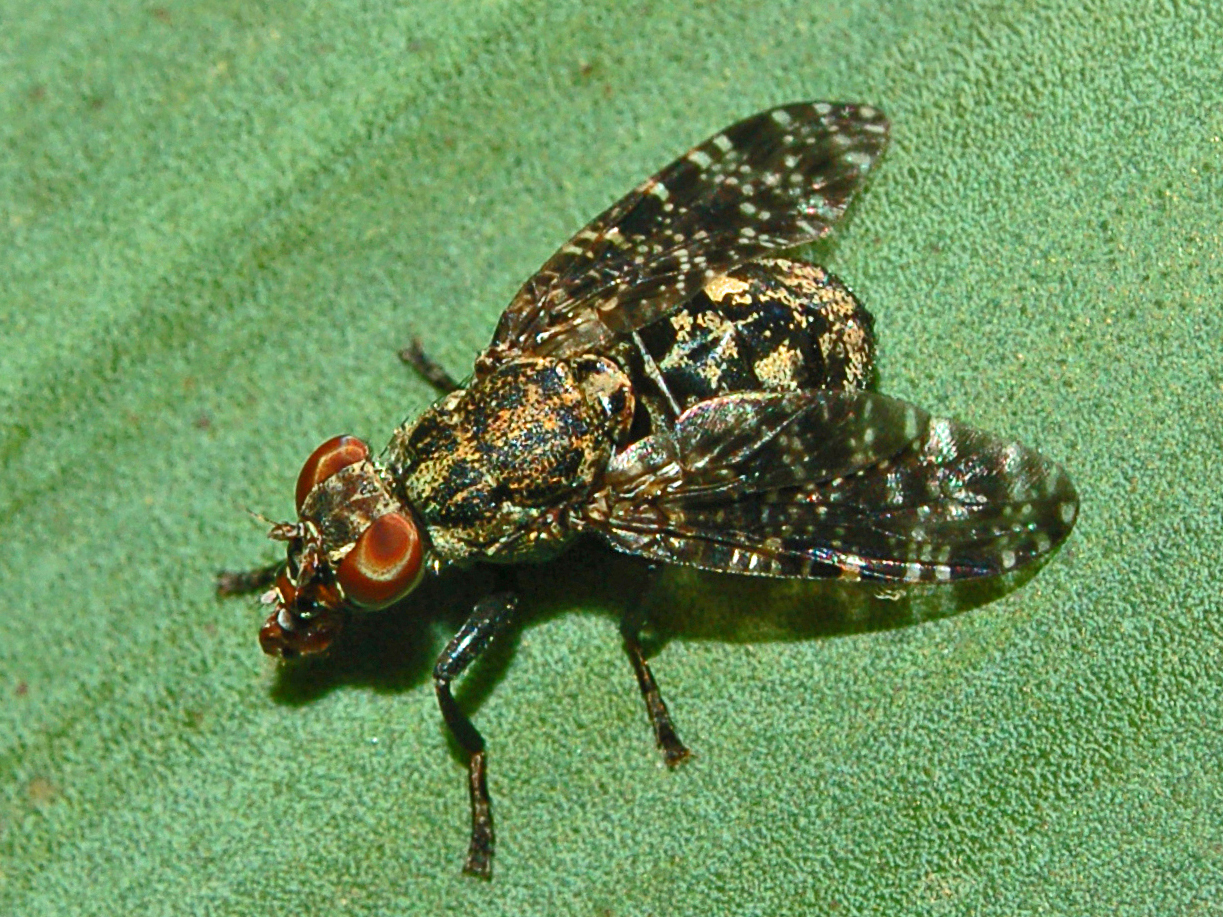

Scientific classification
- Kingdom: Animalia
- Phylum: Arthropoda
- Class: Insecta
- Order: Diptera
- Family: Platystomatidae
- Genus: Platystoma
- Species: P. lugubre

Binomial name
- Platystoma lugubre (Robineau-Desvoidy, 1830)

Synonyms
- Hesyquillia lugubre Robineau-Desvoidy, 1830

= Platystoma lugubre =

Species of fly

Platystoma lugubre is a species of fly in the family Platystomatidae, commonly found in Europe and known for its distinctive wing patterns.

== Subspecies ==
Subspecies include:

- Platystoma lugubre corsicarum Séguy, 1932
- Platystoma lugubre lugubre (Robineau-Desvoidy, 1830)

== Distribution ==
This species is present in most of Europe and in the Near East.

== Habitat ==
These flies mainly inhabit the edges of forests, parks, gardens, woodlands, scrubs and cemeteries.

== Description ==
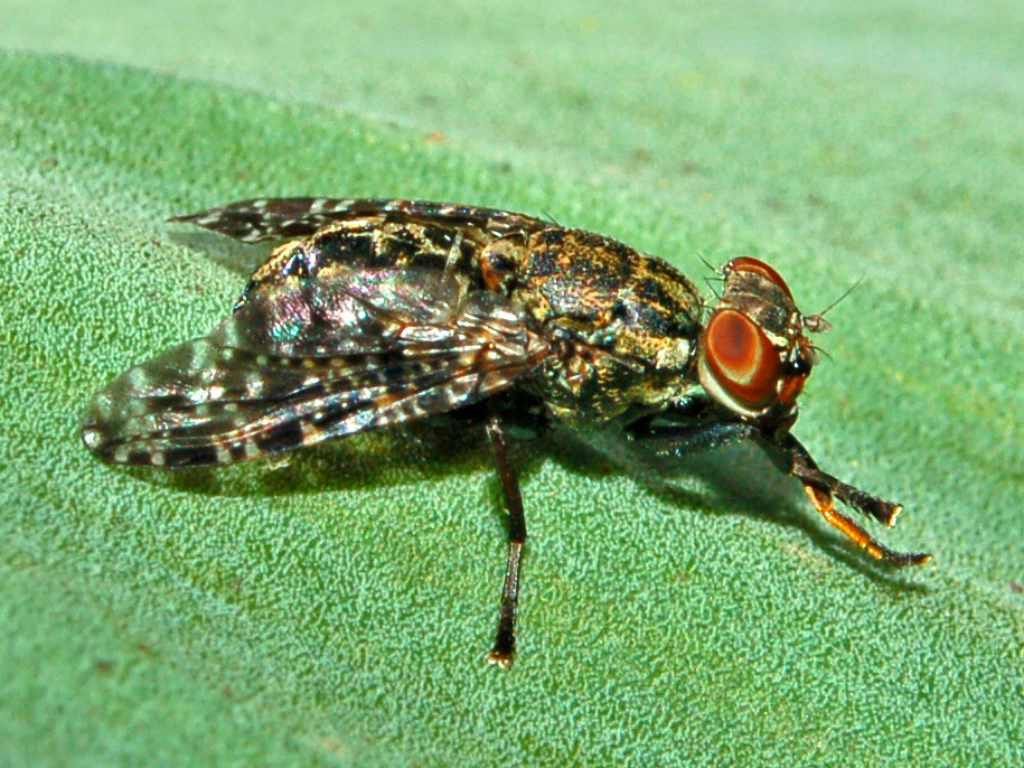
Side view

Platystoma lugubre can reach a length of 6–10 millimetres (0.24–0.39 in). These medium-sized flies have a body mottled with greyish and yellow. The upperside of the abdomen is shiny black with two large spots of yellow gray pollonisity. The lower part of the abdomen is lemon yellow. The large eyes are reddish. Halteres are reddish yellow. Legs are black. Wings are black, mottled with transparent spots.

This species is rather similar to Platystoma seminationis, but the latter is clearly smaller and quite common.

== Biology ==
Adults feed on nectar, while the larvae are coprophagous and develop on dead vertebrates, buried corpses and decomposing plant material.

Video clp. Platystoma lugubre on faeces
