= Rivellia munda =

Scientific classification
- Kingdom: Animalia
- Phylum: Arthropoda
- Class: Insecta
- Order: Diptera
- Family: Platystomatidae
- Genus: Rivellia
- Species: R. munda

Binomial name
- Rivellia munda Namba, 1956

Species of fly

Rivellia munda is a species of signal flies (insects in the family Platystomatidae).
