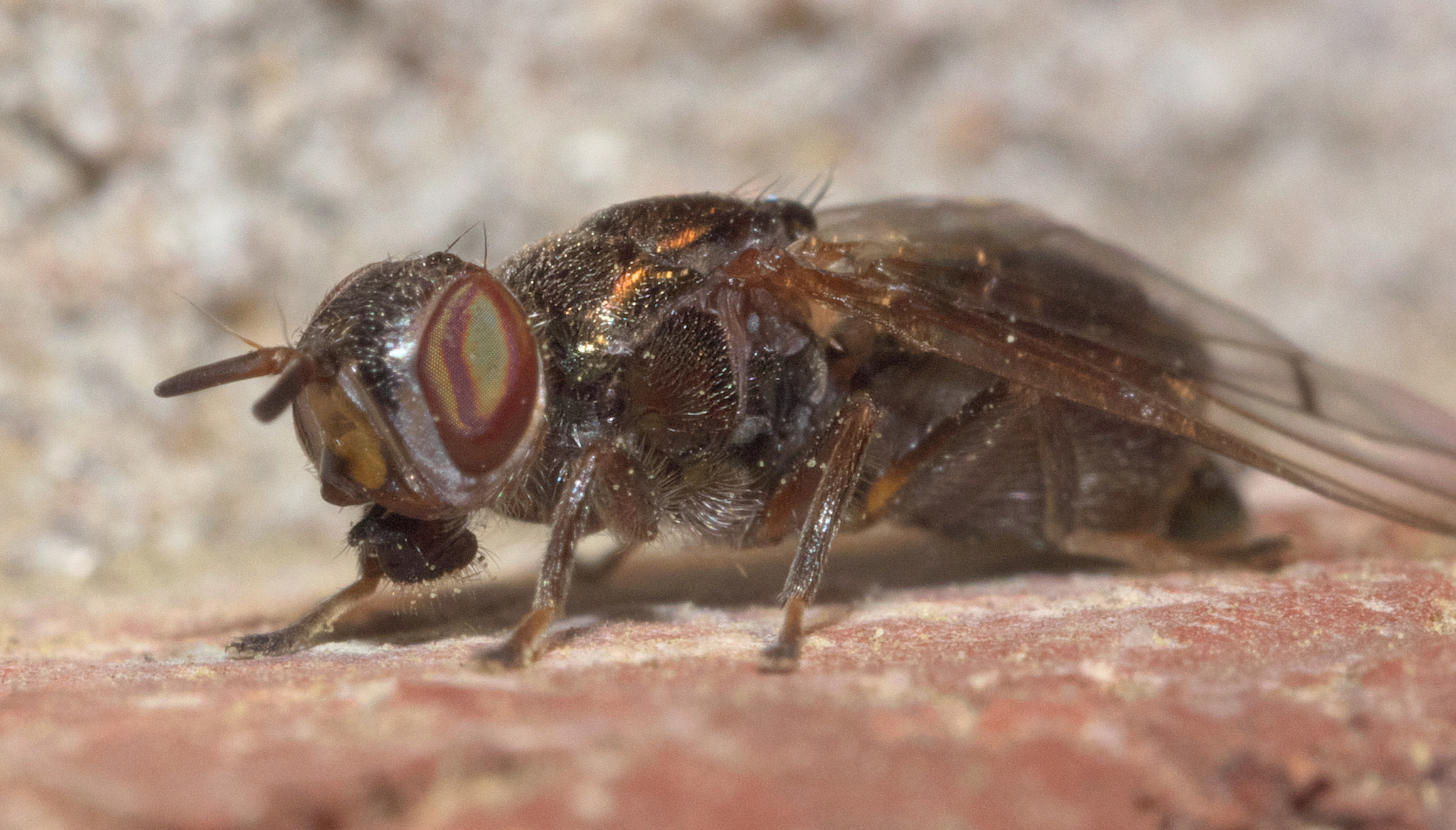
- Senopterina foxleei, Oklahoma

Scientific classification
- Domain: Eukaryota
- Kingdom: Animalia
- Phylum: Arthropoda
- Class: Insecta
- Order: Diptera
- Family: Platystomatidae
- Genus: Senopterina
- Species: S. foxleei

Binomial name
- Senopterina foxleei Shewell, 1962

= Senopterina foxleei =

Species of fly

Senopterina foxleei is a species of signal flies (insects in the family Platystomatidae).
