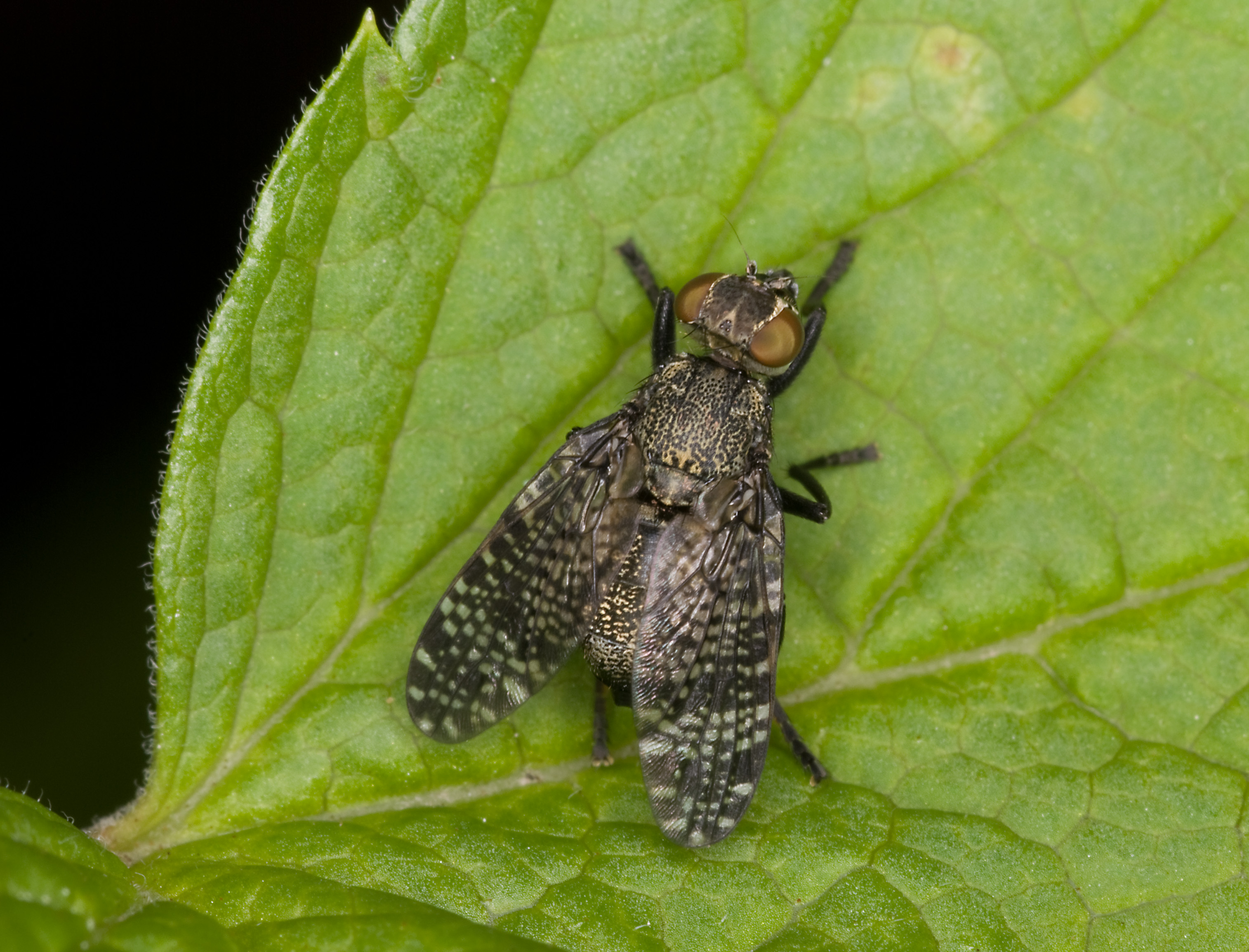

Scientific classification
- Kingdom: Animalia
- Phylum: Arthropoda
- Class: Insecta
- Order: Diptera
- Family: Platystomatidae
- Genus: Platystoma
- Species: P. seminationis

Binomial name
- Platystoma seminationis (Fabricius, 1775)

Synonyms
- Musca seminationis Fabricius, 1775; Musca fulviventris Schrank, 1781; Platystoma valachiae Hendel, 1913; Platystoma rufimana Loew, 1873; Megaglossa vegetationis Rondani, 1869; Platystoma biseta Loew, 1868; Platystoma frauenfeldi Nowicki, 1867; Platystoma angustipennis Loew, 1854; Musca variolosa Schrank, 1837; Platystoma transversa Fabricius, 1805

= Platystoma seminationis =

Species of fly

Platystoma seminationis, the dancing "kiss fly", is a species of fly in the family Platystomatidae.

== Subspecies ==
Subspecies include:

- Platystoma seminationis angustipenne Loew, 1854
- Platystoma seminationis bisetum Loew, 1868
- Platystoma seminationis frauenfeldi Nowicki, 1867
- Platystoma seminationis rufimanum Loew, 1873
- Platystoma seminationis seminationis (Fabricius, 1775)

== Distribution ==
This species is present in most of Europe (Austria, Belgium, United Kingdom, Russia, Czech Republic, Denmark, Finland, Germany, Hungary, Italy, Poland, Romania, Slovakia, Spain, Switzerland, Netherlands and Ukraine) and in the Near East. It is adventive in North America.

== Habitat ==
These flies inhabit forest fringes or hedges, primarily on low herbaceous vegetation in shady places.

== Description ==
Platystoma seminationis can reach a body length of 5.5–6.5 millimetres (0.22–0.26 in). In these flies the interocular space and the epistomes are black and the eyes are reddish-brown. Thorax is greyish. The wings are translucent, greyish brown, with light spots. The abdomen is black, without punctuation. Tarsi are monochromatic black. The largest tarsal segments are reddish near the base, or show reddish hairs on lower side. Moreover halteres have a blackish brown club.

== Biology ==
Adults can be found from May to October. They mainly feed on nectar and pollen of the cypress spurge (Euphorbia cyparissias), green spurge (Euphorbia esula) and other Euphorbiaceae, as well as on feces. Larvae develop in and feed on decaying vegetable material, on mushrooms and on roots of mushroom-infected plants and are probably saprophages.

These flies have a highly developed ritual of courtship, during which after a dance of rapprochement the male and female "kiss" each other, touching together with their large proboscis for 5-15 seconds.

== Gallery ==
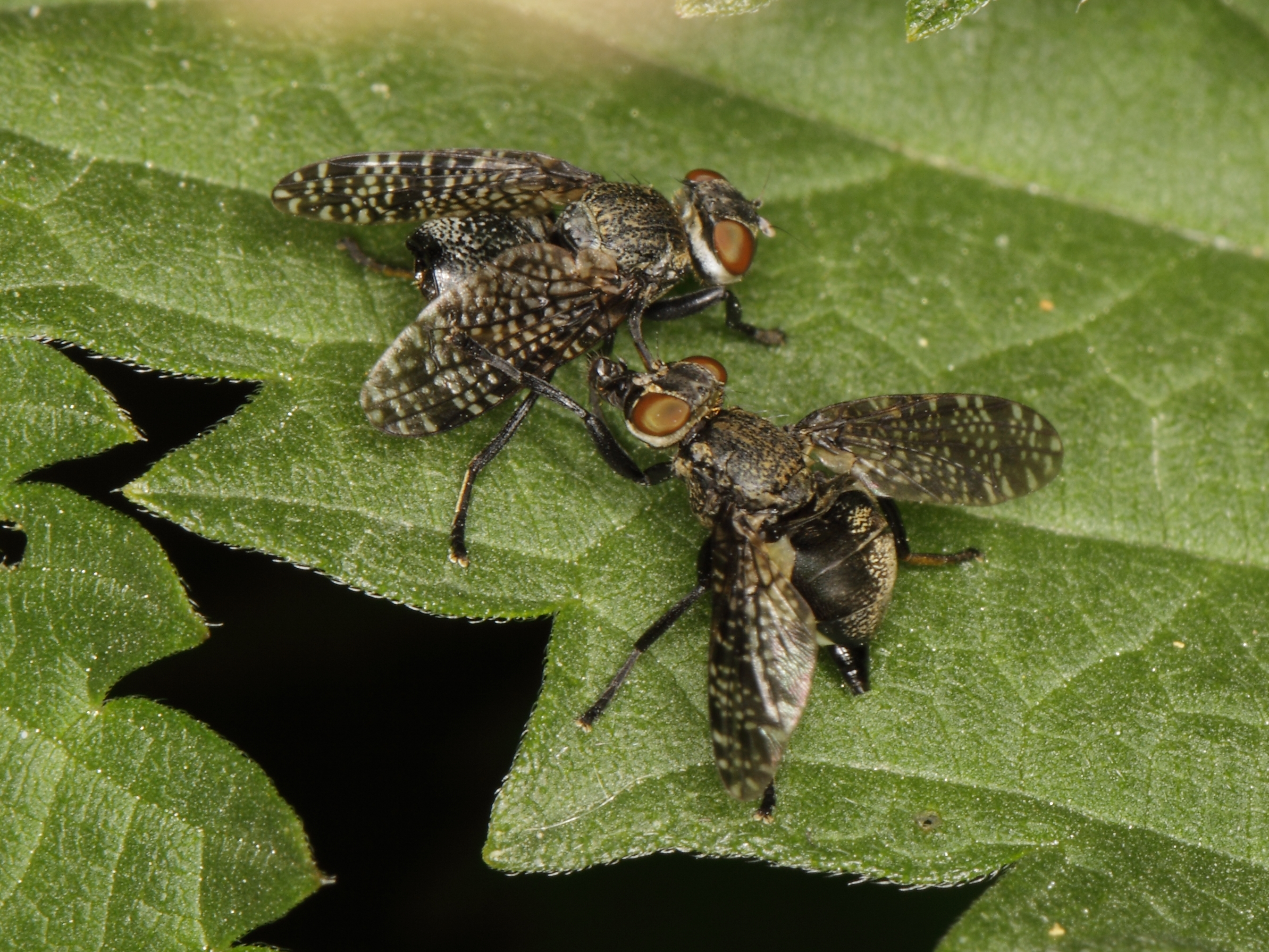
Platystoma seminationis Courtship

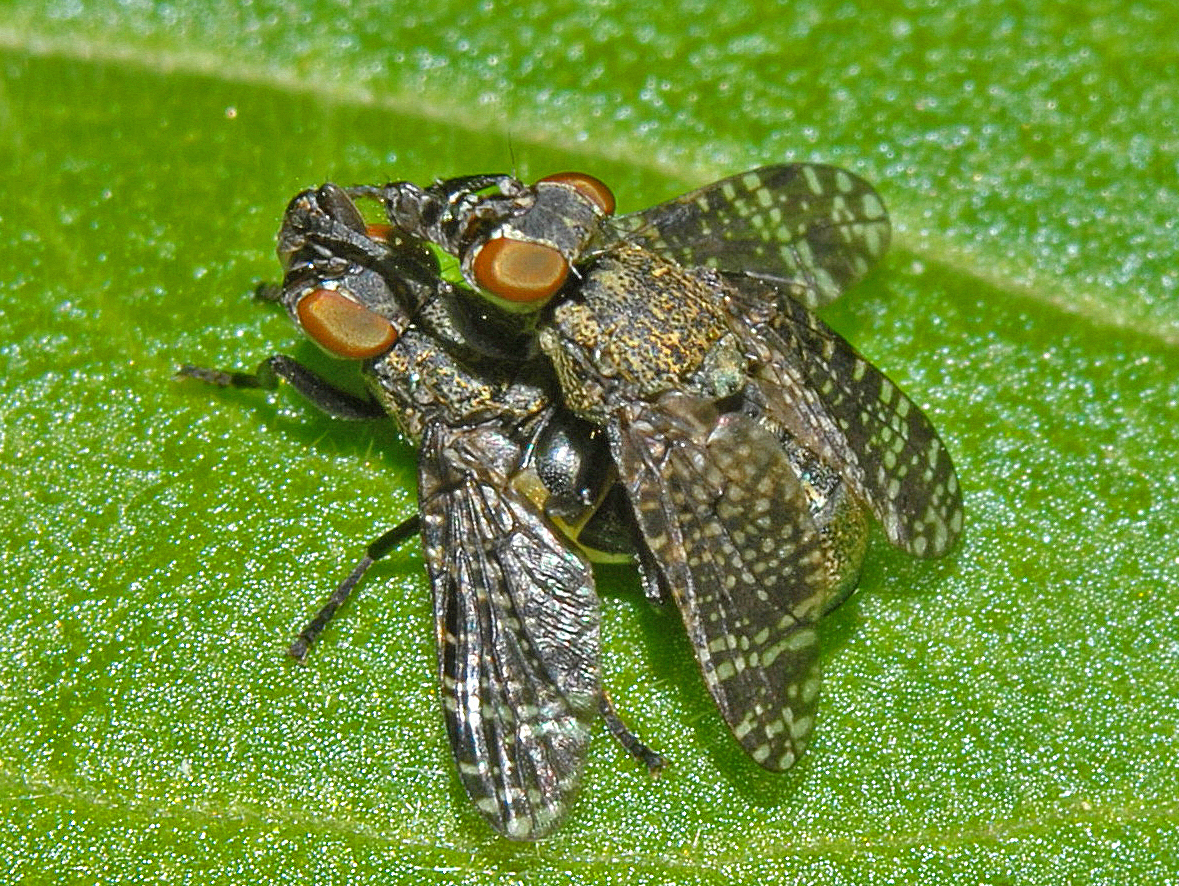
Mating couple

Platystoma seminationis video
