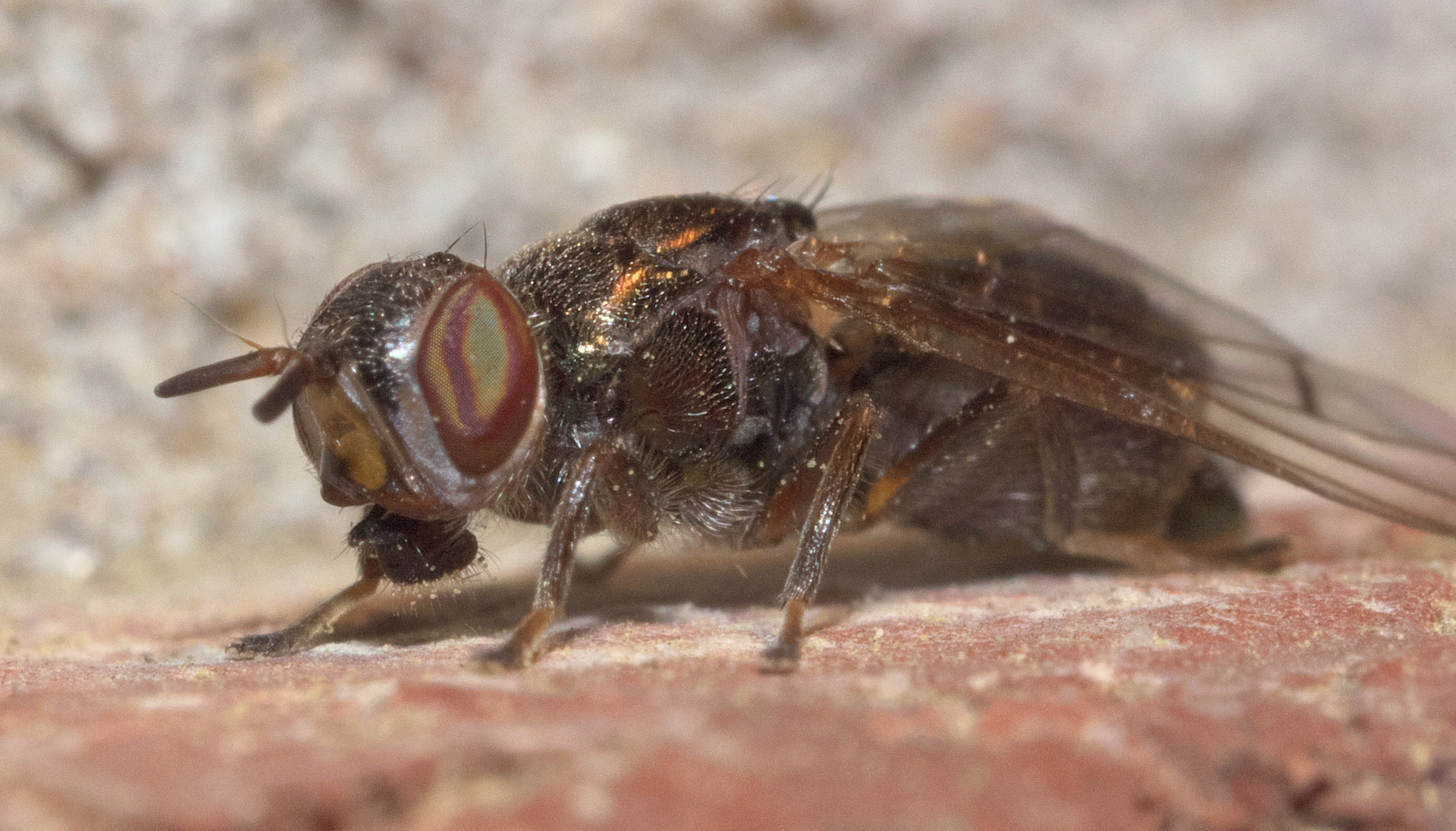

Scientific classification
- Domain: Eukaryota
- Kingdom: Animalia
- Phylum: Arthropoda
- Class: Insecta
- Order: Diptera
- Family: Platystomatidae
- Subfamily: Platystomatinae
- Genus: Senopterina; Macquart, 1835

Type species
- Dacus brevipes Fabricius, 1805

Synonyms
- Briciniella Williston, 1896; Bricinnia Walker, 1861; Bricinniella Giglio-Tos, 1893; Bricinniella Neave, 1939; Stenopterina Agassiz, 1847; Stenopterina Loew, 1862

= Senopterina =

Genus of flies

Senopterina is a genus of signal flies (insects in the family Platystomatidae). There are about 17 described species in Senopterina.

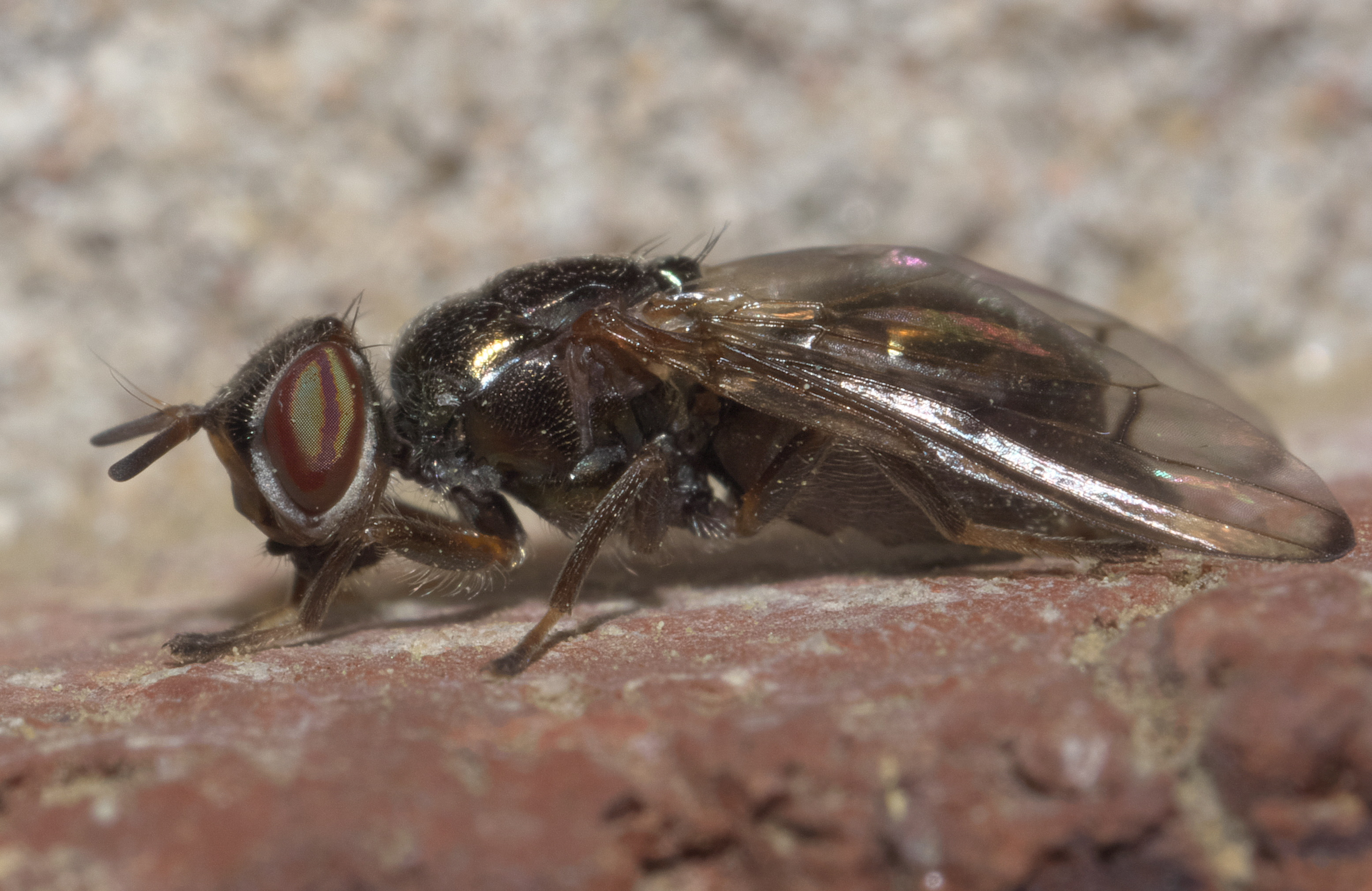

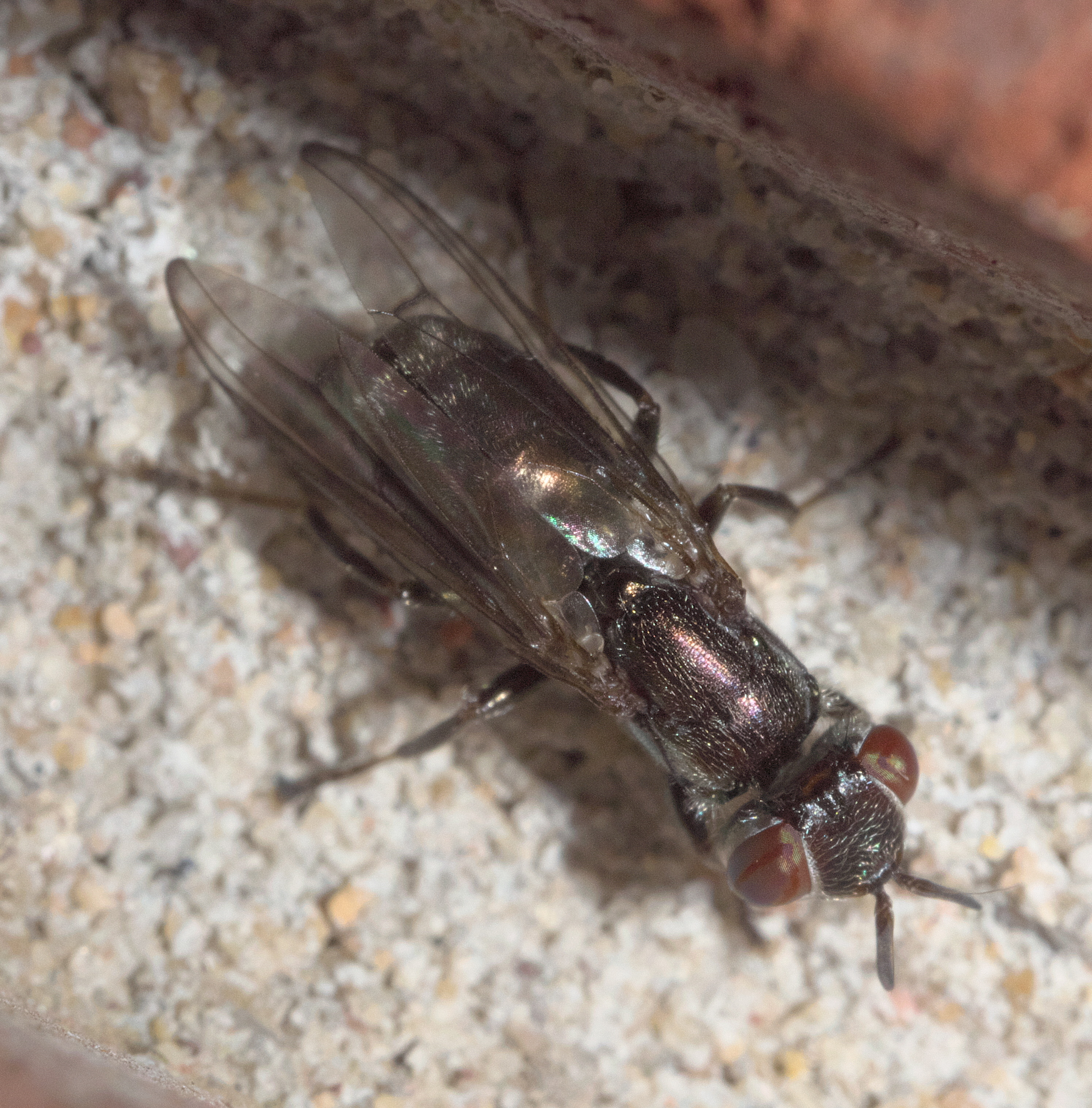

== Species ==
These 17 species belong to the genus Senopterina:

- S. alligata Wulp, 1898^{c g}
- S. brevipes (Fabricius, 1805)
- S. caerulescens Loew, 1873^{i c g b}
- S. chiriquiana Hennig, 1940^{c g}
- S. cyanea (Giglio-tos, 1893)^{i c g}
- S. distincta (Walker, 1849)^{c g}
- S. flexivitta (Walker, 1861)^{i c g b}
- S. foxleei Shewell, 1962^{i c g b}
- S. fuscicosta Hendel, 1914
- S. infuscata Hendel, 1914
- S. macularis (Fabricius, 1805)
- S. mexicana (Macquart, 1843)^{i c g}
- S. ochripennis Enderlein, 1924
- S. varia Coquillett, 1900^{i c g b}
- S. verrucosa Hendel, 1914
- S. violacea (Macquart, 1843)^{c}

Data sources: i = ITIS, c = Catalogue of Life, g = GBIF, b = Bugguide.net
