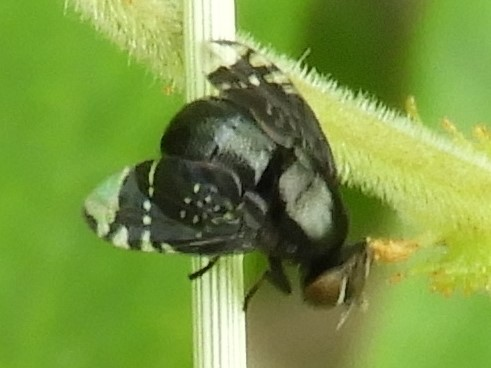
- Amphicnephes stellatus

Scientific classification
- Domain: Eukaryota
- Kingdom: Animalia
- Phylum: Arthropoda
- Class: Insecta
- Order: Diptera
- Family: Platystomatidae
- Subfamily: Platystomatinae
- Genus: Amphicnephes; Loew, 1873

Type species
- Amphicnephes pertusus Loew, 1873

= Amphicnephes =

Genus of flies

Amphicnephes is a genus of signal flies in the family Platystomatidae. There are at least three described species in Amphicnephes.

== Species ==
These three species belong to the genus Amphicnephes:

- Amphicnephes fasciola Coquillett, 1900
- Amphicnephes pullus (Wiedemann, 1830)
- Amphicnephes stellatus Wulp, 1899^{c g}

Data sources: c = Catalogue of Life, g = GBIF,
