= Oeciotypa =

- Oeciotypa hendeli Lindner, 1957

Scientific classification
- Kingdom: Animalia
- Phylum: Arthropoda
- Class: Insecta
- Order: Diptera
- Family: Platystomatidae
- Subfamily: Plastotephritinae
- Genus: Oeciotypa; Hendel, 1914

Type species
- Oeciotypa parallelomma Hendel, 1914

Genus of flies

Oeciotypa is a genus of flies (Diptera) belonging to the family Platystomatidae.

== Distribution ==
Species belonging to this genus are present in parts of Africa.

== Species ==
- O. disjuncta Whittington, 2003
- O. hendeli Lindner, 1957
- O. parallelomma Hendel, 1914
- O. rotundiventris Frey, 1932
- O. skaia Whittington, 2003
- O. splendens Whittington, 2003
