= Árpád Soós (zoologist) =

Hungarian entomologist (1912–1991)

Árpád Soós (20 September 1912, in Budapest – 1 June 1991, in Budapest) was a Hungarian zoologist, entomologist and museologist. He is best known for his work on leeches and flies (Diptera) and, as co-editor with László Papp, for the Catalogue of Palaearctic Diptera 1986–1993.

== Main works ==
- Identification key to the leech (Hirudinoidea) genera of the World, with a catalogue of the species. I. Family: Piscicolidae; II. Families: Semiscolecidae, Trematobdellidae, Americobdellidae, Diestecostomatidae; III. Family: Erpobdellidae; IV. Family: Haemadipsidae; V. Family: Hirudinidae; VI. Family: Glossiphoniidae (Acta zoologica hungarica, 11, 1965, 417–463; 12, 1966, 145–160, 371–407; 13, 1967, 417–432; 15, 1969, 151–201, 397–454)
- Spenidius horvathi gen. n., sp. n. aus Spanien (Homoptera: Issidae) (Folia entomologica hungarica 29(1), 1976, 87–91)
- Poloskák VIII. - Heteroptera VIII. (Magyarország Állatvilága, 17(8), Bp., 1963, 1-48)
- Bábtojó legyek - Muscidae pupiparae (Magyarország Állatvilága, 15(17), Bp., 1955, 1-20); Torpikkelynélküli legyek I. - Muscidae acalyptratae. I. (Magyarország Állatvilága, 15(1), Bp., 1959, 1-88)
- Csupaszlegyek - Laposfejű legyek. Psilidae - Platystomatidae (Magyarország Állatvilága, 15(2), Bp., 1980, 1–100)
- Family Micropezidae (Tylidae); Family Neriidae; Family Tanypezidae; Family Psilidae; Family Pyrgotidae; Family Platystomatidae (Platystomidae); Family Otitidae (Ortalidae) All in : Soós, Á. and Papp, L. (ed.): Catalogue of Palaearctic Diptera, Bp., 9, 1984, 19–59)
- 70 Clusiidae (In: McAlpine, J. F. et al. (ed.): Manual of Nearctic Diptera, 2. Research Branch, Agriculture Canada, Monograph No. 28, Ottawa, 1987, 853–857).
