= Richard Frey =

Chinese doctor and politician

Richard Frey (Fu Lai)
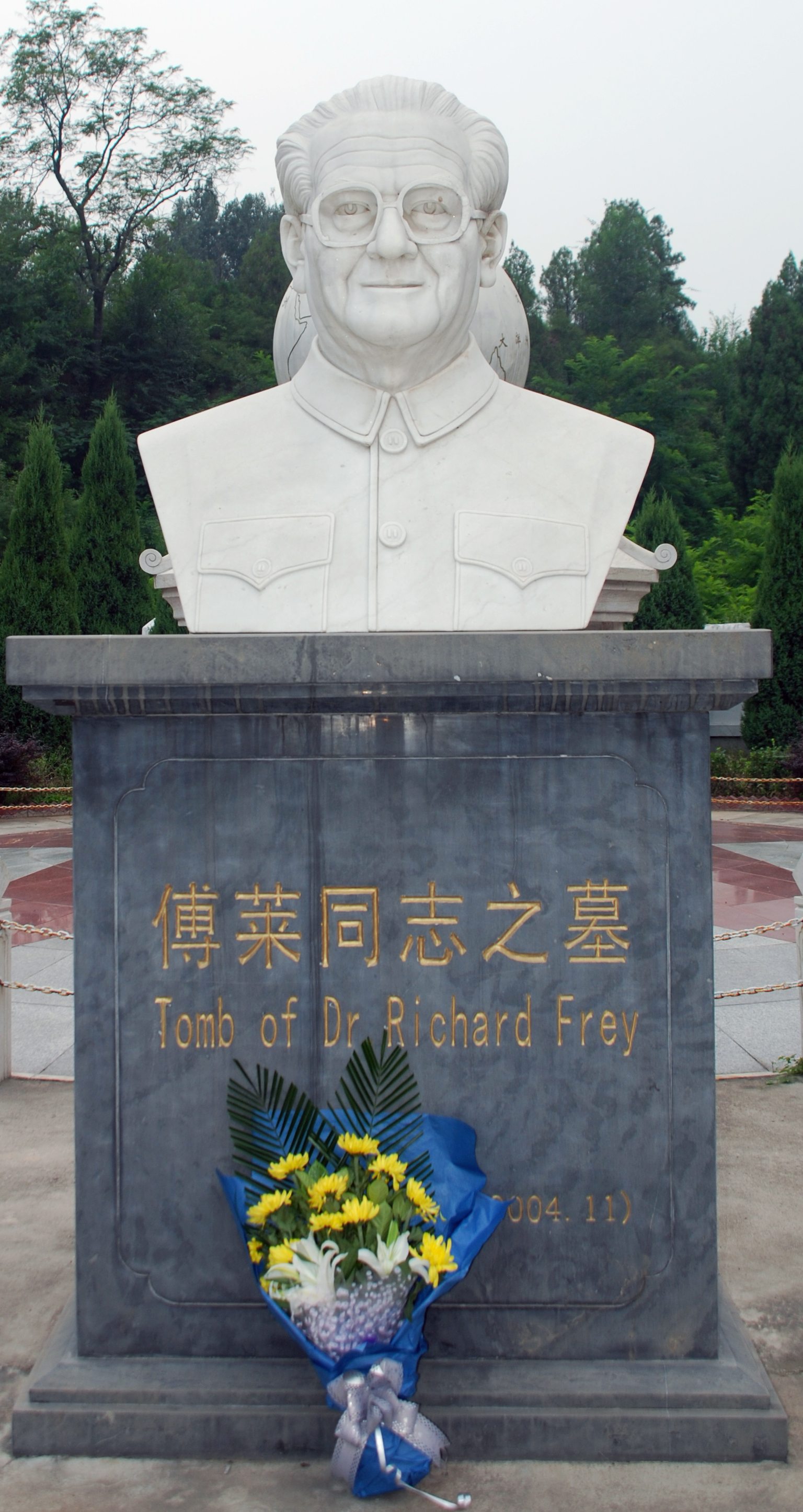
- Tomb statue of Richard Frey
- Born: Richard Stein; 11 February 1920; Vienna, Austria
- Died: 16 November 2004 (aged 84); Beijing, China
- Occupations: Military physician, politician
- Known for: Jewish doctor from Austria who became a CCP member in China
- Political party: Chinese Communist Party
- Spouse: Li Binzhu

Richard Frey (11 February 1920 – 16 November 2004), also known by his Chinese name Fu Lai (Chinese: 傅莱), was a Chinese military physician and politician originally from Austria. He fled due to the Second World War from Austria to China and spent his entire life in his adopted country. Because of his outstanding contributions to national independence, national liberation and to build China's land, he has gained a high reputation in China.

== Life ==
Frey was born on 11 February 1920 as Richard Stein, the only child in a middle class Jewish family in Vienna. In 1930, he visited the Döblinger high school and wished later to become a doctor. With great support from his parents, he learned Radiography at the "Institute for radiology Holzknecht" and "Kaiser Franz Joseph-Ambulatorium und Jubiläumsspital" in his senior classes at the same time. At school, he was active in politics, joined the Scouting at the age of 14 and later the Communist Youth of Austria (KJV) and the Communist Party of Austria (KPÖ).

As a result of the occupation and annexation of Austria by Nazi Germany (Anschluss), he was expelled shortly before his Matura from school. Under threat of arrest by the Gestapo, he aborted his medical studies in late 1938. He escaped from Austria and finally arrived in Shanghai, China on 15 January 1939, with very little money (five Reichsmark). Frey went to Tianjin and worked for the Tianjin People's Hospital.

He participated in the anti-Japanese War in 1941 and came to the front lines of the war in the "Shanxi-Chahar-Hebei border area", changing his name from "Stein" to "Frey" and joined the Eighth Route Army. He received a Chinese name, "Fu Lai", and began working for the Bethune Health School.

In 1942, he applied for a membership in the Chinese Communist Party (CCP) and was accepted in 1944, later took part in the Historically important 7th National Congress of the Chinese Communist Party in Yan'an – the political and military base of the CCP – as a guest auditor. After the war, Frey was able to obtain citizenship, and remained in China until his death in 2004.

While performing as a doctor at the battlefront, he was training doctors and paramedics. In the war year of 1943 due to enemy blockade, the border region lacked the drugs quinine against malaria, Frey fought epidemic in the troop with acupuncture with great success and therefore received an award of Mao Zedong. In 1945 he succeeded to produce penicillin for the first time in China despite harsh conditions in Yan'an. As an advocates and adviser to the Research Community of Chinese and Western Medicine of Shaanxi-Gansu-Ningxia Border Region, which was first established in Yan'an, he was a pioneer of Integrative Medicine Treatment in China.

After the founding of the People's Republic of China 1949, Richard Frey chose to stay, taking part in the development of the country and received the Chinese nationality in 1952. In war Richard Frey lost contact to the love of his youth Hanna in Vienna and raised a family in Yan'an with his comrade Li Binzhu in 1945. In the early 60s the marriage was annulled for political reasons and years later he married for the second time. After the death of his father 1962 he was allowed to travel to Austria for a short time visiting his mother, who was living alone in Vienna.

Richard Frey has worked as a physician for disease control in remote areas of southwest China for ten years, and since 1962 as a specialist and consultant for the Chinese Academy of Medical Sciences in Beijing. Under the direction of Richard Frey in the early 80s, a national medical information network was built in China. He founded and managed the first computer database for the medical information center in Beijing. For this purpose a pilot project was first launched in Beijing connecting a hospital on the Peking Medical Union campus to a nearby computing facility attached to the Beijing Municipal Government. The facility at the time was the first major center in China to house an advanced mainframe computer (from the Burroughs Corporation) for multi-purpose use. Software modules from a U.S. oriented hospital information system were modified to suit the Chinese situation. The computer was acquired under the first United Nations Development Programme (UNDP) technical assistance project (CPR/79-001) for China.

Prior to his retirement, he was the Chairman of the Information Institute and curator of the Medical Academy of Sciences of China.

During the Cultural Revolution, and several political movements in China Richard Frey experienced the political repression and unlawful treatment for years. Only in 1983 he was appointed as the Foreign Expert of the CCP in Beijing as a member of the Chinese People's Political Consultative Conference (CPPCC) and participated in the VI. VII. VIII. and IX. CPPCC. Besides his medical scientific activities he always tried to present the New China to the outside world building relations between China and his home country Austria as well as Western countries.

== Commemoration ==
On 16 November 2004 Richard Frey died at the age of 84 in Beijing. Both the Chinese President Hu Jintao and Austrian President Heinz Fischer laid a wreath of honor. (According to his last wish his mortal remains should be donated for medical research).

On 21 February 2006 the Döblinger school unveiled a memorial plaque honoring Richard Frey, its text was written by the president of Austria. On 23 July 2007, the Chinese government set up a monument for Richard Frey at the former battlefront (near Beijing). Also on this day his first wife was buried in Vienna.

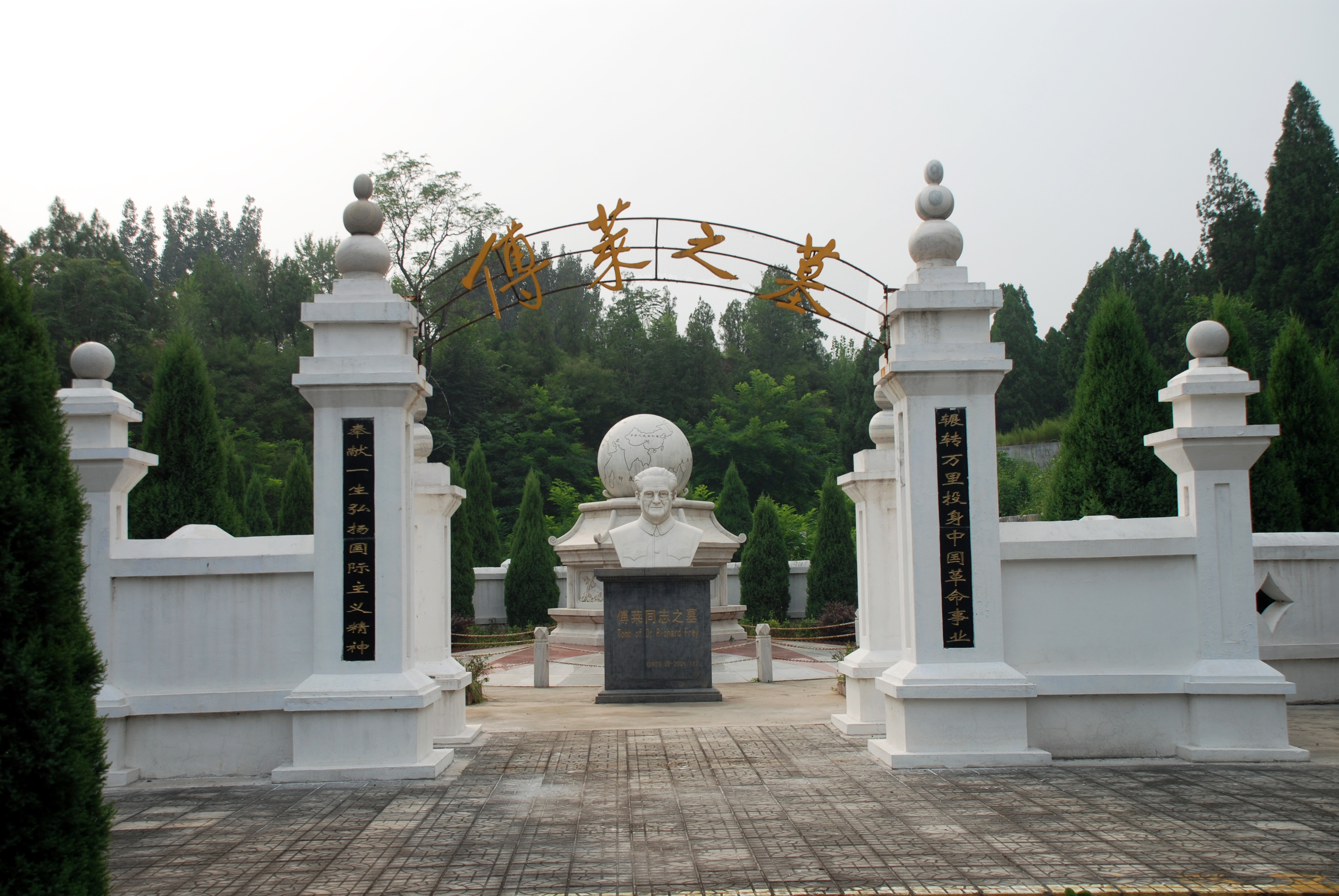
monument from Richard Frey in Tangxian China

== Literature ==
- An International Communist Richard Frey ISBN 978-7-81136-161-2/R.161
- In memory of Richard Frey ISBN 978-7-5621-4375-8
- The Heavenly Ford ISBN 978-7-201-06559-5
