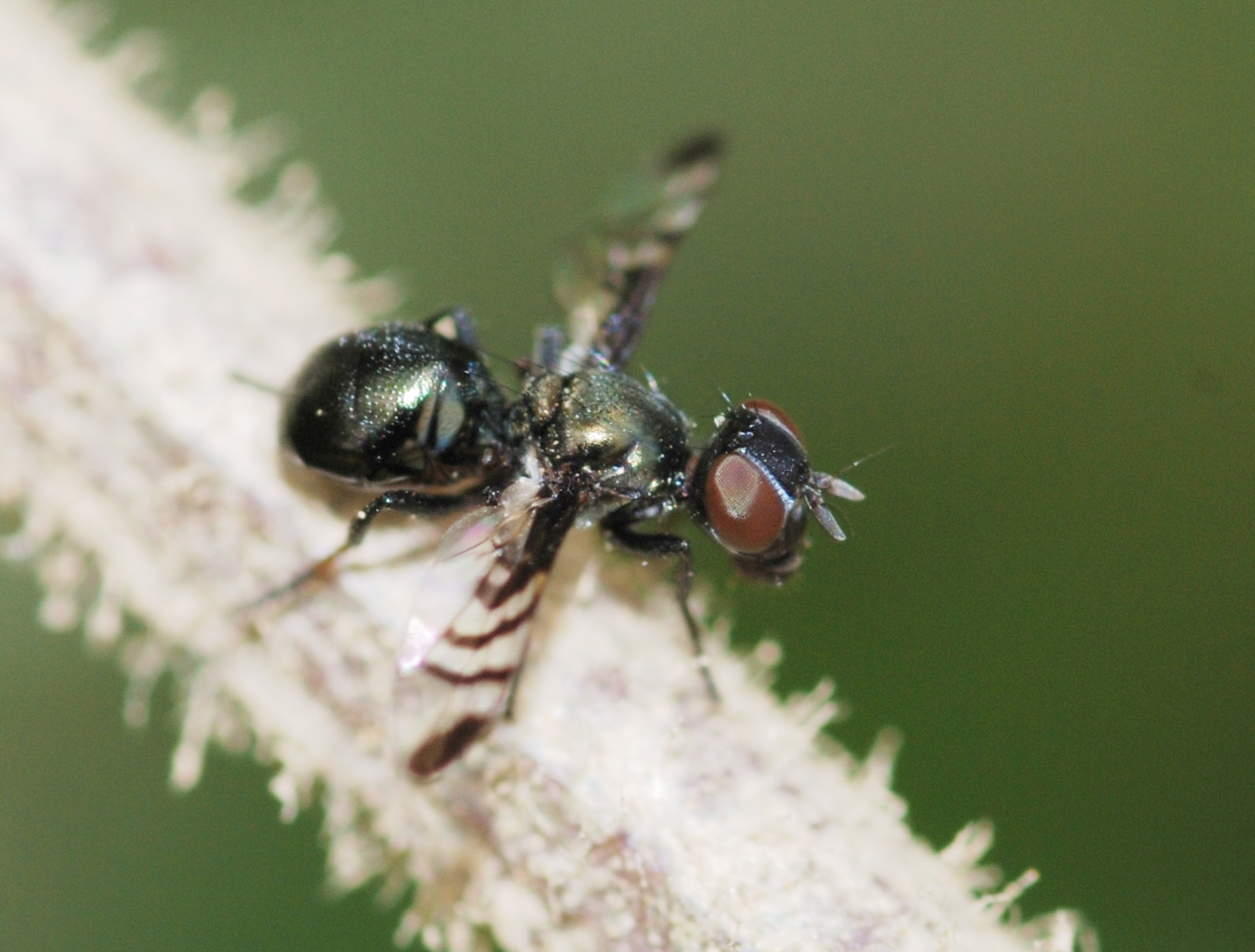
- Rivellia syngenesiae

Scientific classification
- Kingdom: Animalia
- Phylum: Arthropoda
- Clade: Pancrustacea
- Class: Insecta
- Order: Diptera
- Family: Platystomatidae
- Subfamily: Platystomatinae
- Genus: Rivellia; Robineau-Desvoidy, 1830

Type species
- Rivellia herbarum Robineau-Desvoidy, 1830

= Rivellia =

Genus of insects

Mating behaviour of Rivellia syngenesiae

Signal flies of genus Rivellia mating

Rivellia is a genus of signal flies (insects in the family Platystomatidae). There are at least 140 described species in Rivellia.

== Economic importance ==
There is limited information and understanding about the juvenile stages of most signal fly species. Thirteen species of Rivellia have, however, been studied in the field of agriculture because the larvae of many of these flies are associated with both living and decaying root nodules of nitrogen-fixing legumes, such as soybean, peanuts, and pigeon pea. They can also be found on the roots or flowers of other cultivated plants like eggplant, sorghum, black locust, and Narcissus.

With soybean, this association has been shown to be economically significant because pest-induced stress caused by these flies can significantly reduce nitrogen fixation and yields; Rivellia quadrifasciata, Rivellia basilaris, and Rivellia basilaris are all known pests of root nodules of this crop. Because this is a widely distributed genus, economically important effects are likely to be found in many other crops world-wide.

== See also ==
- List of Rivellia species
