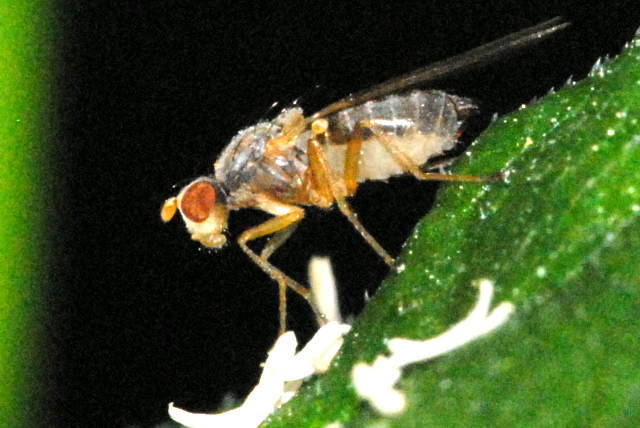
- Neoleria

Scientific classification
- Domain: Eukaryota
- Kingdom: Animalia
- Phylum: Arthropoda
- Class: Insecta
- Order: Diptera
- Family: Heleomyzidae
- Subfamily: Heleomyzinae; Westwood, 1840

Tribes
- Heleomyzini; Oecotheini; Orbelliini

= Heleomyzinae =

Subfamily of flies

Heleomyzinae is a subfamily of flies in the family Heleomyzidae. There are about 17 genera and more than 400 described species in Heleomyzinae.

== Genera ==
These 17 genera belong to the subfamily Heleomyzinae:

- Acantholeria Garrett, 1921
- Amoebaleria Garrett, 1921
- Anorostoma Loew, 1862
- Cinderella Steyskal, 1949
- Eccoptomera Loew, 1862
- Heleomyza Fallén, 1810
- Lutomyia Aldrich, 1922
- Morpholeria C.B.Garrett, 1921
- Neoleria Malloch, 1919
- Neossos Malloch, 1927
- Oecothea Haliday, 1837
- Oldenbergiella Czerny, 1924
- Orbellia Robineau-Desvoidy, 1830
- Paraneossos Wheeler, 1955
- Pseudoleria Garrett, 1921
- Schroederella Enderlein, 1920
- Scoliocentra Loew, 1862
