= Anorostoma maculatum =

Scientific classification
- Domain: Eukaryota
- Kingdom: Animalia
- Phylum: Arthropoda
- Class: Insecta
- Order: Diptera
- Family: Heleomyzidae
- Tribe: Heleomyzini
- Genus: Anorostoma
- Species: A. maculatum

Binomial name
- Anorostoma maculatum Darlington, 1908

Species of fly

Anorostoma maculatum is a species of fly in the family Heleomyzidae.
