= Anorostoma alternans =

Scientific classification
- Kingdom: Animalia
- Phylum: Arthropoda
- Clade: Pancrustacea
- Class: Insecta
- Order: Diptera
- Family: Heleomyzidae
- Tribe: Heleomyzini
- Genus: Anorostoma
- Species: A. alternans

Binomial name
- Anorostoma alternans Garrett, 1925

Species of fly

Anorostoma alternans is a species of fly in the family Heleomyzidae. The species was originally described by C.B.D. Garrett in 1925
