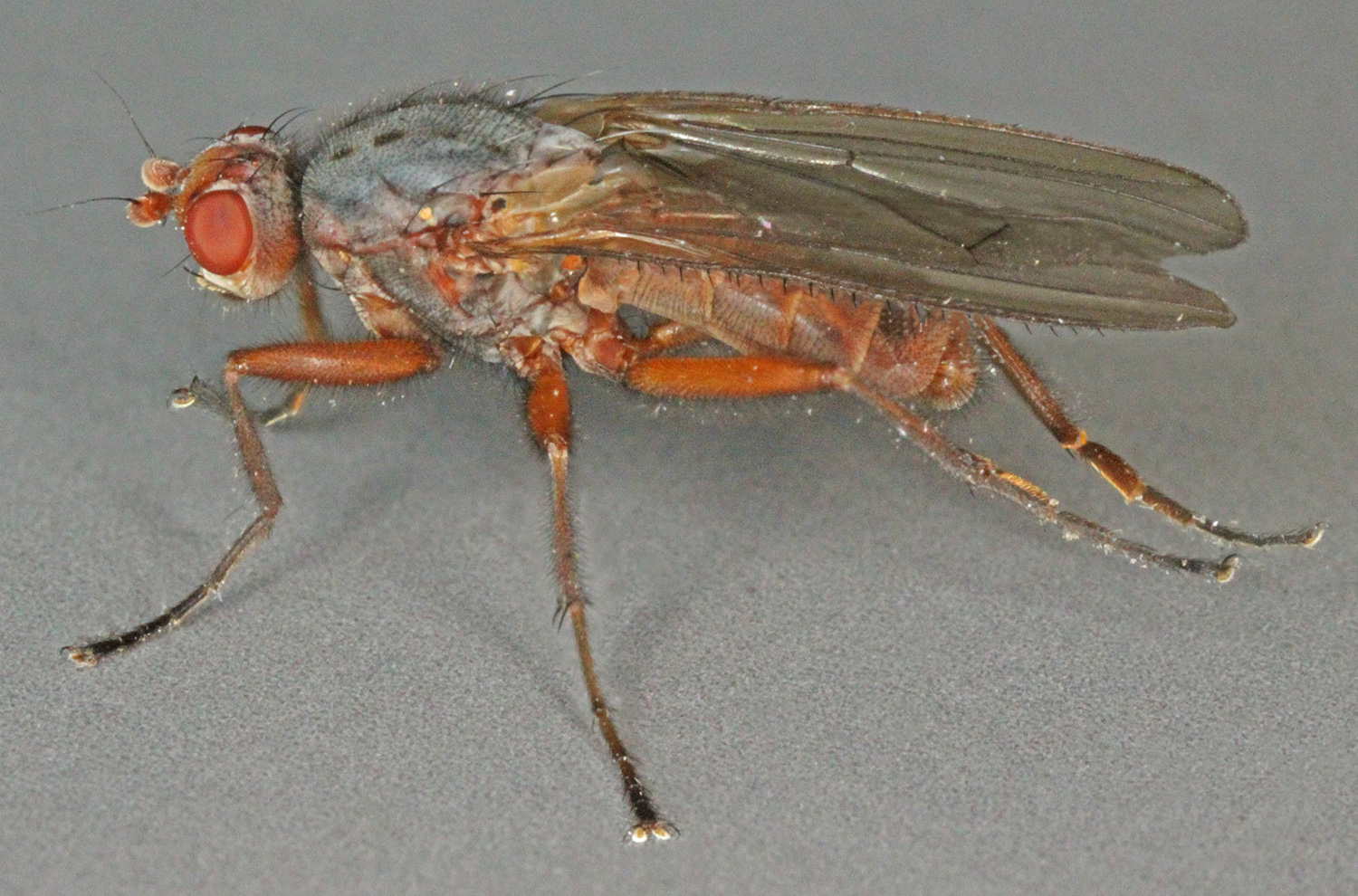
- Scoliocentra villosa North Wales

Scientific classification
- Kingdom: Animalia
- Phylum: Arthropoda
- Class: Insecta
- Order: Diptera
- Family: Heleomyzidae
- Genus: Scoliocentra
- Species: S. villosa

Binomial name
- Scoliocentra villosa (Meigen, 1830)

= Scoliocentra villosa =

Species of insect

Scoliocentra villosa is a species of fly in the family Heleomyzidae. It is found in the Palearctic. This species was described in 1830 by Johann Wilhelm Meigen as Helomyza villosa.

The body length is 5.5 to 10 mm. It is characterized by the presence of setae on the propleura, usually one pair of setae on the prothorax, hairy mesopleura and numerous hairs at the base of the rear notopleural setae.For terms see Morphology of Diptera.

Scoliocentra villosa adult insects and saprophagous larvae are found in burrows and caves

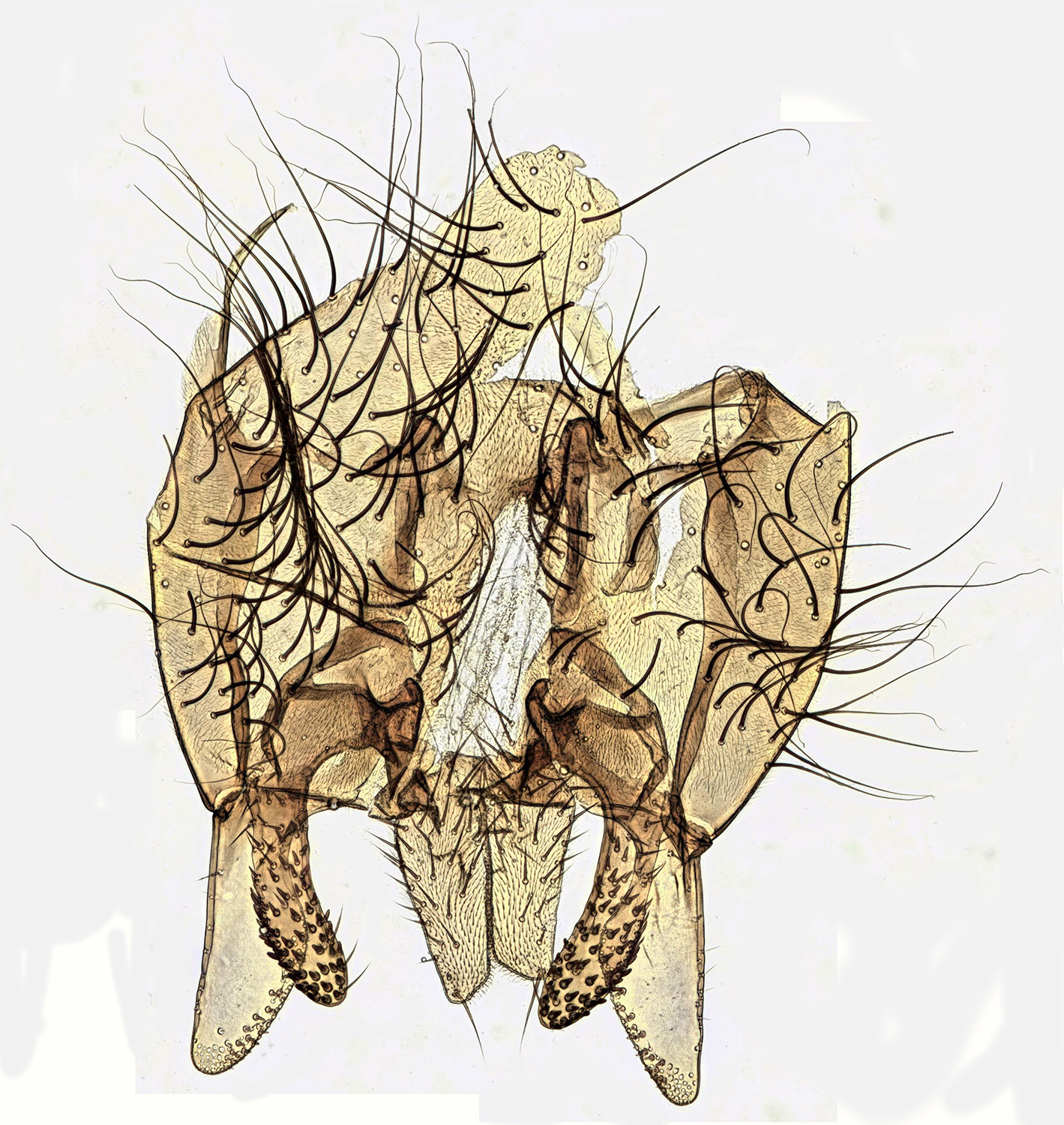
male genitalia

It is known from Ireland, Great Britain, France, Belgium, the Netherlands, Germany, Denmark, Sweden, Norway, Finland, Switzerland, Austria, Poland, Latvia, Estonia, Belarus, the Czech Republic, Slovakia, Hungary and Russia through Siberia to the Far East East

Content in this edit is translated from the existing Polish Wikipedia article at pl:Scoliocentra villosa; see its history for attribution
