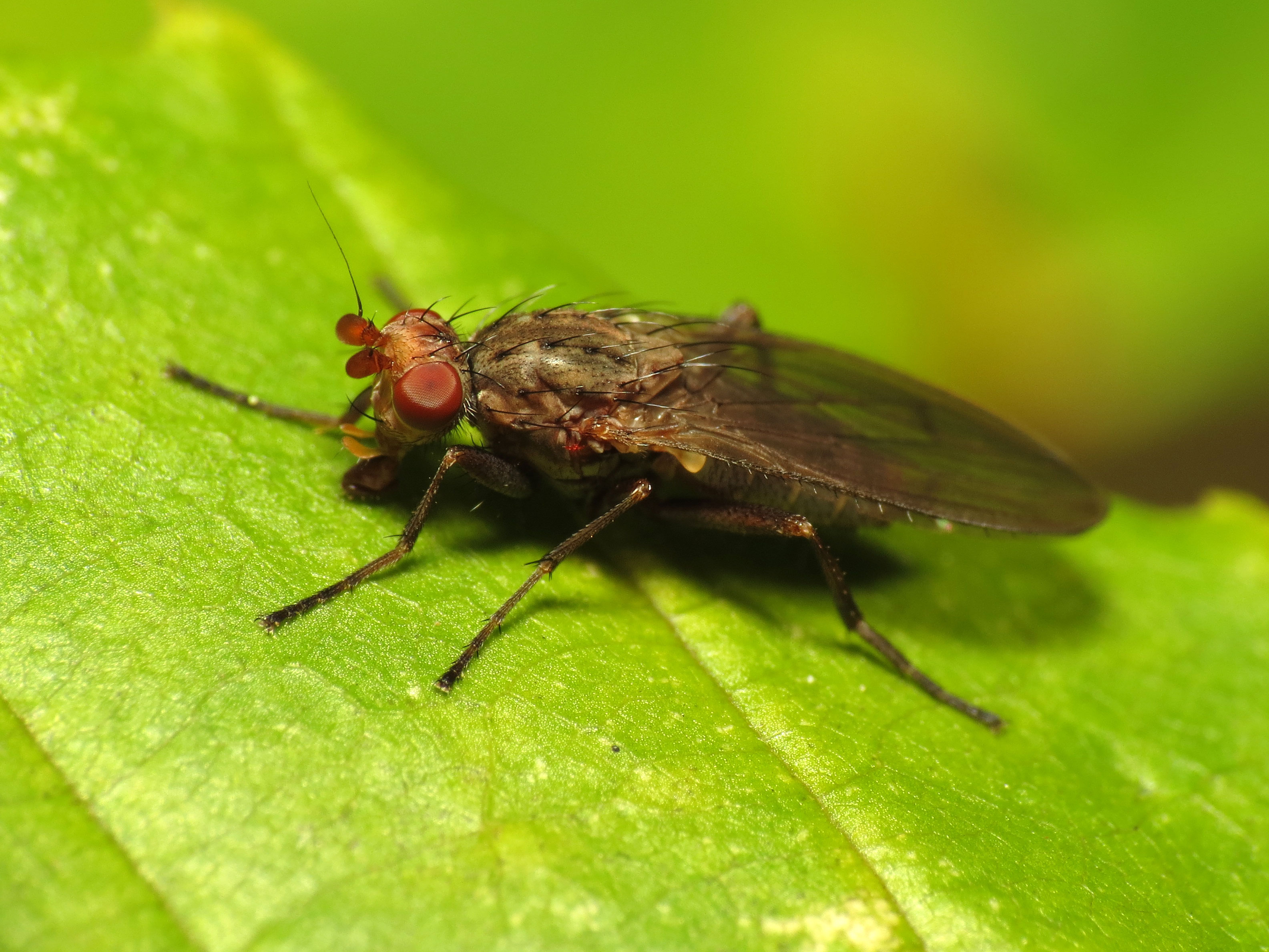

Scientific classification
- Kingdom: Animalia
- Phylum: Arthropoda
- Class: Insecta
- Order: Diptera
- Family: Heleomyzidae
- Subfamily: Heleomyzinae
- Tribe: Heleomyzini
- Genus: Scoliocentra; Loew, 1862

Synonyms
- Achaetomus Coquillett, 1907; Actora Meigen, 1826

= Scoliocentra =

Genus of flies

Scoliocentra is a genus of flies in the family Heleomyzidae. There are at least 40 described species in Scoliocentra.

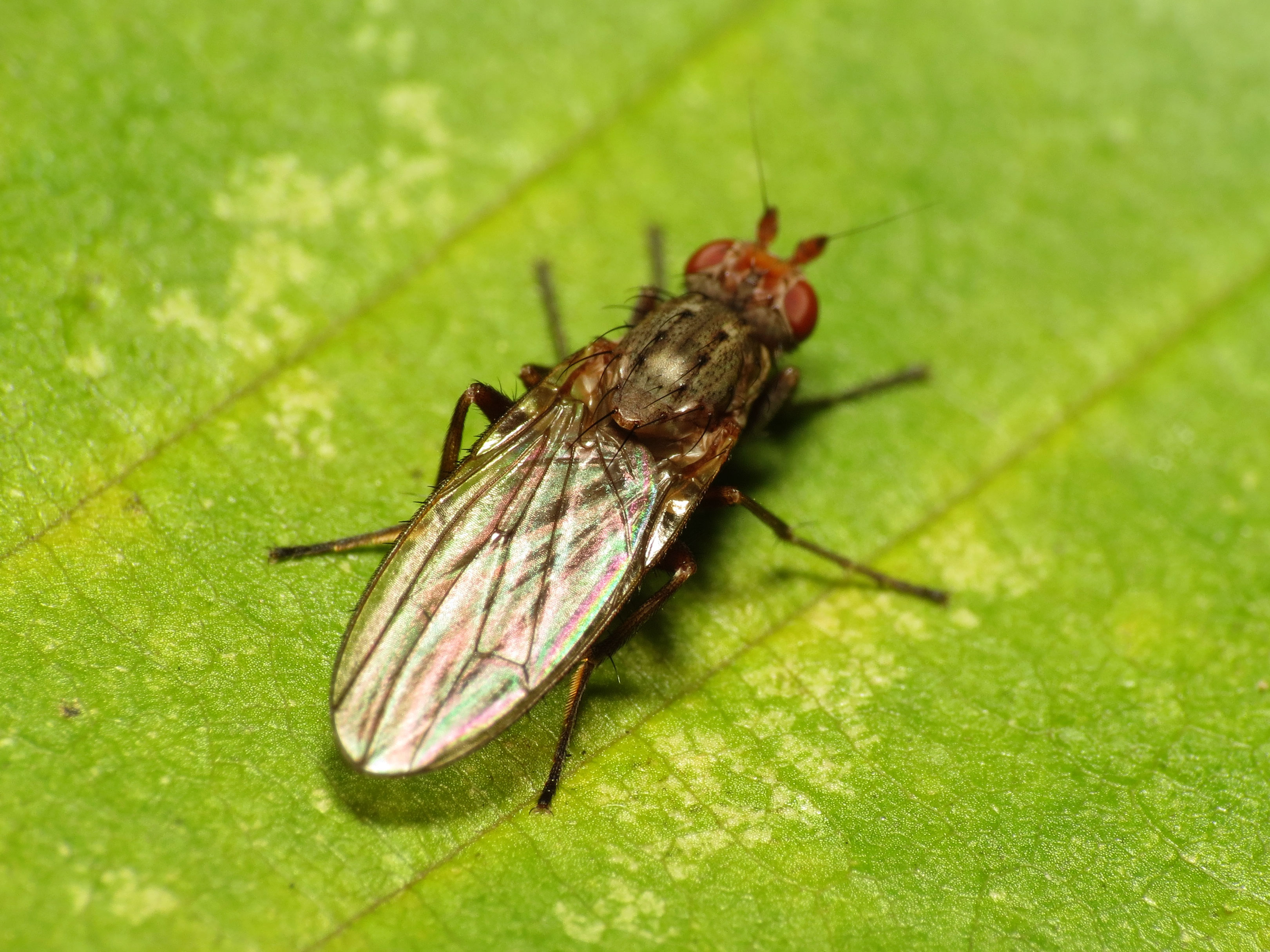

== Species ==
These 44 species belong to the genus Scoliocentra:

- S. alpina (Loew, 1862)^{c g}
- S. amplicornis (Czerny, 1924)^{c g}
- S. biconfusa Gorodkov, 1972^{c g}
- S. borealis (Czerny, 1924)^{i c g}
- S. brachypterna (Loew, 1873)^{c g}
- S. caesia (Meigen, 1830)^{i c g}
- S. caucasicus Woznica, 2006^{c g}
- S. ceianui Martinek, 1985^{c g}
- S. collini Woznica, 2004^{c g}
- S. confusa (Wahlgren, 1918)^{i c g}
- S. czekanowskii Gorodkov, 1977^{c g}
- S. czernyi Papp & Woznica, 1993^{c g}
- S. defessa (Osten Sacken, 1877)^{i c g}
- S. dupliciseta (Strobl, 1894)^{c g}
- S. engeli (Czerny, 1928)^{c g}
- S. europaeus Papp & Woznica, 1993^{c g}
- S. flavotestacea (Zetterstedt, 1838)^{i c g}
- S. fraterna Loew, 1863^{i c g}
- S. glauca (Aldrich and Darlington, 1908)^{i c g}
- S. gonea (Garrett, 1925)^{i c g}
- S. gorodkovi Papp & Woznica, 1993^{c g}
- S. helvola Loew, 1862^{i c g}
- S. infuscata (Gill, 1962)^{i c g}
- S. kamtschatica Gorodkov, 1963^{c g}
- S. mariei (Séguy, 1934)^{c g}
- S. martineki Papp & Woznica, 1993^{c g}
- S. mongolicus Papp & Woznica, 1993^{c g}
- S. nigrinervis (Wahlgren, 1918)^{c g}
- S. obscuriventris Gorodkov, 1972^{c g}
- S. perplexa (Garrett, 1924)^{i c g}
- S. sabroskyi (Gill, 1962)^{i c g}
- S. sackeni (Garrett, 1925)^{i c g}
- S. scutellaris (Zetterstedt, 1838)^{c g}
- S. scutellata (Garrett, 1921)^{i c g}
- S. soosi Papp & Woznica, 1993^{c g}
- S. spectabilis (Loew, 1862)^{i c g}
- S. thoracica Collin, 1935^{i c g}
- S. tianshanica Gorodkov, 1977^{c g}
- S. tincta (Walker, 1849)
- S. triangulata (Garrett, 1925)^{i c g}
- S. troglodytes (Loew, 1863)^{c g}
- S. tularensis (Gill, 1962)^{i c g}
- S. ventricosa (Becker, 1907)^{c g}
- S. villosa (Meigen, 1830)^{c g}

Data sources: i = ITIS, c = Catalogue of Life, g = GBIF, b = Bugguide.net
