= Anorostoma cinereum =

Scientific classification
- Domain: Eukaryota
- Kingdom: Animalia
- Phylum: Arthropoda
- Class: Insecta
- Order: Diptera
- Family: Heleomyzidae
- Genus: Anorostoma
- Species: A. cinereum

Binomial name
- Anorostoma cinereum Curran, 1932

Species of fly

Anorostoma cinereum is a species of fly in the family Heleomyzidae.
