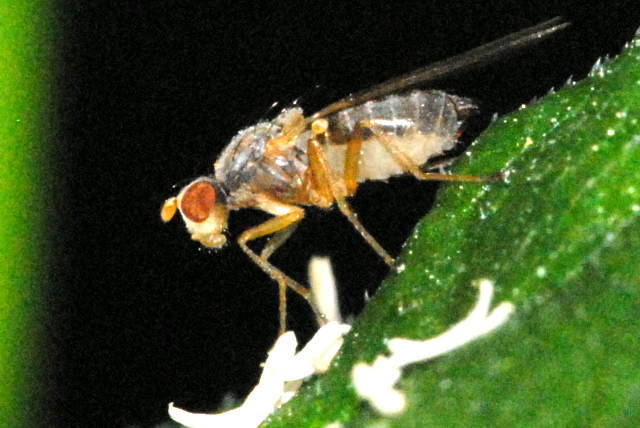
- Neoleria inscripta

Scientific classification
- Domain: Eukaryota
- Kingdom: Animalia
- Phylum: Arthropoda
- Class: Insecta
- Order: Diptera
- Family: Heleomyzidae
- Genus: Neoleria
- Species: N. inscripta

Binomial name
- Neoleria inscripta (Meigen, 1830)

Synonyms
- Belpharoptera leucostoma Loew, 1863; Helomyza inscripta Meigen, 1830

= Neoleria inscripta =

Species of fly

Neoleria inscripta is a species of fly in the family Heleomyzidae. It is found in Europe.
