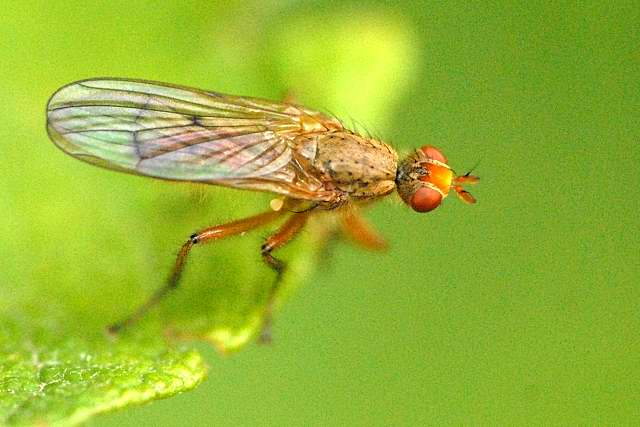

Scientific classification
- Domain: Eukaryota
- Kingdom: Animalia
- Phylum: Arthropoda
- Class: Insecta
- Order: Diptera
- Family: Heleomyzidae
- Genus: Schroederella
- Species: S. iners

Binomial name
- Schroederella iners (Meigen, 1830)

Synonyms
- Helomyza iners Meigen, 1830

= Schroederella iners =

Species of fly

Schroederella iners is a species of fly in the family Heleomyzidae. It is found in Europe.
