= Scoliocentra tincta =

Scientific classification
- Kingdom: Animalia
- Phylum: Arthropoda
- Class: Insecta
- Order: Diptera
- Family: Heleomyzidae
- Genus: Scoliocentra
- Species: S. tincta

Binomial name
- Scoliocentra tincta (Walker, 1849)

Synonyms
- Achaetomus pilosus Coquillett, 1907; Actora ferruginea Walker, 1849; Amoebaleria gigas Garrett, 1921; Blepharoptera pubescens Loew, 1862; Helomyza tincta Walker, 1849

Species of fly

Scoliocentra tincta is a species of fly in the family Heleomyzidae.
