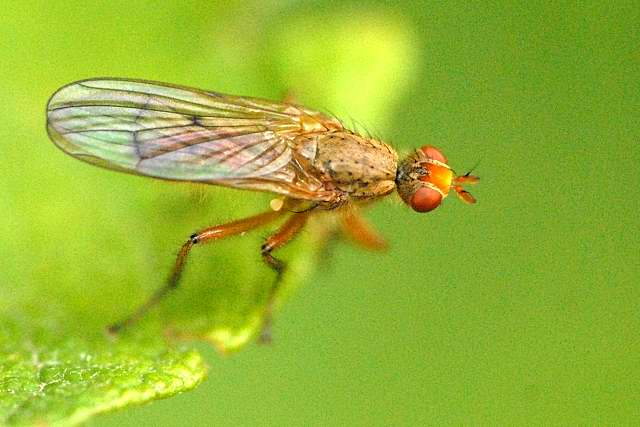
- Schroederella iners

Scientific classification
- Domain: Eukaryota
- Kingdom: Animalia
- Phylum: Arthropoda
- Class: Insecta
- Order: Diptera
- Family: Heleomyzidae
- Tribe: Heleomyzini
- Genus: Schroederella; Enderlein, 1920

Type species
- Helomyza iners Meigen, 1830

= Schroederella =

Genus of flies

Schroederella is a genus of flies in the family Heleomyzidae. There are about 14 described species in Schroederella.

== Species ==
These 14 species belong to the genus Schroederella:

- Schroederella bifida Papp & Carles-Tolra, 1994^{c g}
- Schroederella fuscopicea Gill, 1962^{i c g}
- Schroederella hispanica Papp & Carles-Tolra, 1994^{c g}
- Schroederella hungarica Papp & Carles-Tolra, 1994^{c g}
- Schroederella iners (Meigen, 1830)^{i c g b}
- Schroederella kirilli Papp, 2007^{c g}
- Schroederella luteoala (Garrett, 1925)^{i c g}
- Schroederella media Papp, 2007^{c g}
- Schroederella minuta Papp & Carles-Tolra, 1994^{c g}
- Schroederella nigra (Czerny, 1931)^{c g}
- Schroederella nipponica Okadome, 1969^{c g}
- Schroederella pectinulata (Czerny, 1931)^{c g}
- Schroederella robusta Gorodkov, 1962^{c g}
- Schroederella segnis Czerny, 1930^{c g}

Data sources: i = ITIS, c = Catalogue of Life, g = GBIF, b = Bugguide.net
