= Anorostoma =

Scientific classification
- Domain: Eukaryota
- Kingdom: Animalia
- Phylum: Arthropoda
- Class: Insecta
- Order: Diptera
- Family: Heleomyzidae
- Tribe: Heleomyzini
- Genus: Anorostoma; Loew, 1862

Type species
- Anorostoma marginatum Loew, 1862

Genus of flies

Anorostoma is a genus of flies in the family Heleomyzidae. There are about 17 described species in Anorostoma.

== Species ==
These 17 species belong to the genus Anorostoma:

- A. alternans Garrett, 1925^{i c g b}
- A. carbona Curran, 1933^{i c g}
- A. chiloensis Brèthes, 1924^{c g}
- A. cinereum Curran, 1932^{i c g b}
- A. coloradense Garrett, 1924^{i c g}
- A. currani Garrett, 1922^{i c g}
- A. fumipenne Gill, 1962^{i c g}
- A. grande Darlington, 1908^{i c g}
- A. hinei Garrett, 1925^{i c g}
- A. jamesi Gill, 1962^{i c g}
- A. jersei Garrett, 1924^{i c g}
- A. longipile Gill, 1962^{i c g}
- A. lutescens Curran, 1933^{i c g}
- A. maculatum Darlington, 1908^{i c g b}
- A. marginatum Loew, 1862^{i c g}
- A. opacum Coquillett, 1901^{i c g}
- A. wilcoxi Curran, 1933^{i c g}

Data sources: i = ITIS, c = Catalogue of Life, g = GBIF, b = Bugguide.net
