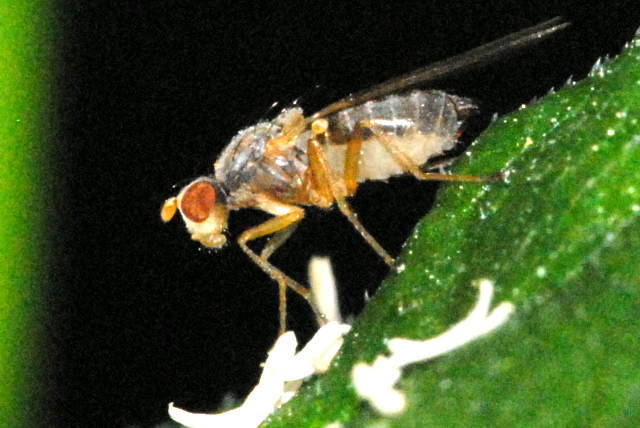

Scientific classification
- Domain: Eukaryota
- Kingdom: Animalia
- Phylum: Arthropoda
- Class: Insecta
- Order: Diptera
- Family: Heleomyzidae
- Tribe: Heleomyzini
- Genus: Neoleria; Malloch, 1919

= Neoleria =

Genus of flies

Neoleria is a genus of flies in the family Heleomyzidae. There are about 16 described species in Neoleria.

== Species ==
These 16 species belong to the genus Neoleria:

- Neoleria aemula Séguy, 1948^{c g}
- Neoleria buccata Czerny, 1924^{c g}
- Neoleria czernyi (Garrett, 1925)^{i c g}
- Neoleria diversa (Garrett, 1925)^{i c g}
- Neoleria flavicornis (Loew, 1862)^{c g}
- Neoleria fuscicornis Czerny, 1924^{c g}
- Neoleria fuscolinea (Garrett, 1921)^{i c g}
- Neoleria inscripta (Meigen, 1830)^{i c g b}
- Neoleria lutea (Loew, 1863)^{i c g}
- Neoleria maritima (Villeneuve, 1921)^{c g}
- Neoleria prominens (Becker, 1897)^{i c g}
- Neoleria propinqua Collin, 1943^{c g}
- Neoleria pusilla (Loew, 1862)^{c g}
- Neoleria ruficauda (Zetterstedt, 1847)^{i c g}
- Neoleria ruficeps (Zetterstedt, 1838)^{c g}
- Neoleria tibialis (Zetterstedt, 1838)^{i}

Data sources: i = ITIS, c = Catalogue of Life, g = GBIF, b = Bugguide.net
