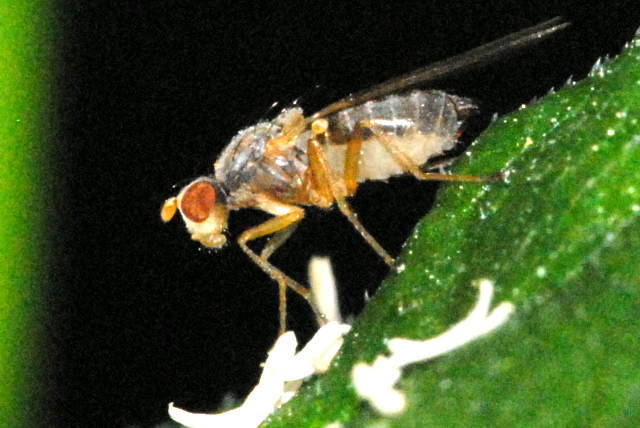
- Neoleria

Scientific classification
- Domain: Eukaryota
- Kingdom: Animalia
- Phylum: Arthropoda
- Class: Insecta
- Order: Diptera
- Family: Heleomyzidae
- Subfamily: Heleomyzinae
- Tribe: Heleomyzini

= Heleomyzini =

Tribe of flies

Heleomyzini is a tribe of flies in the family Heleomyzidae. There are about 10 genera and more than 180 described species in Heleomyzini.

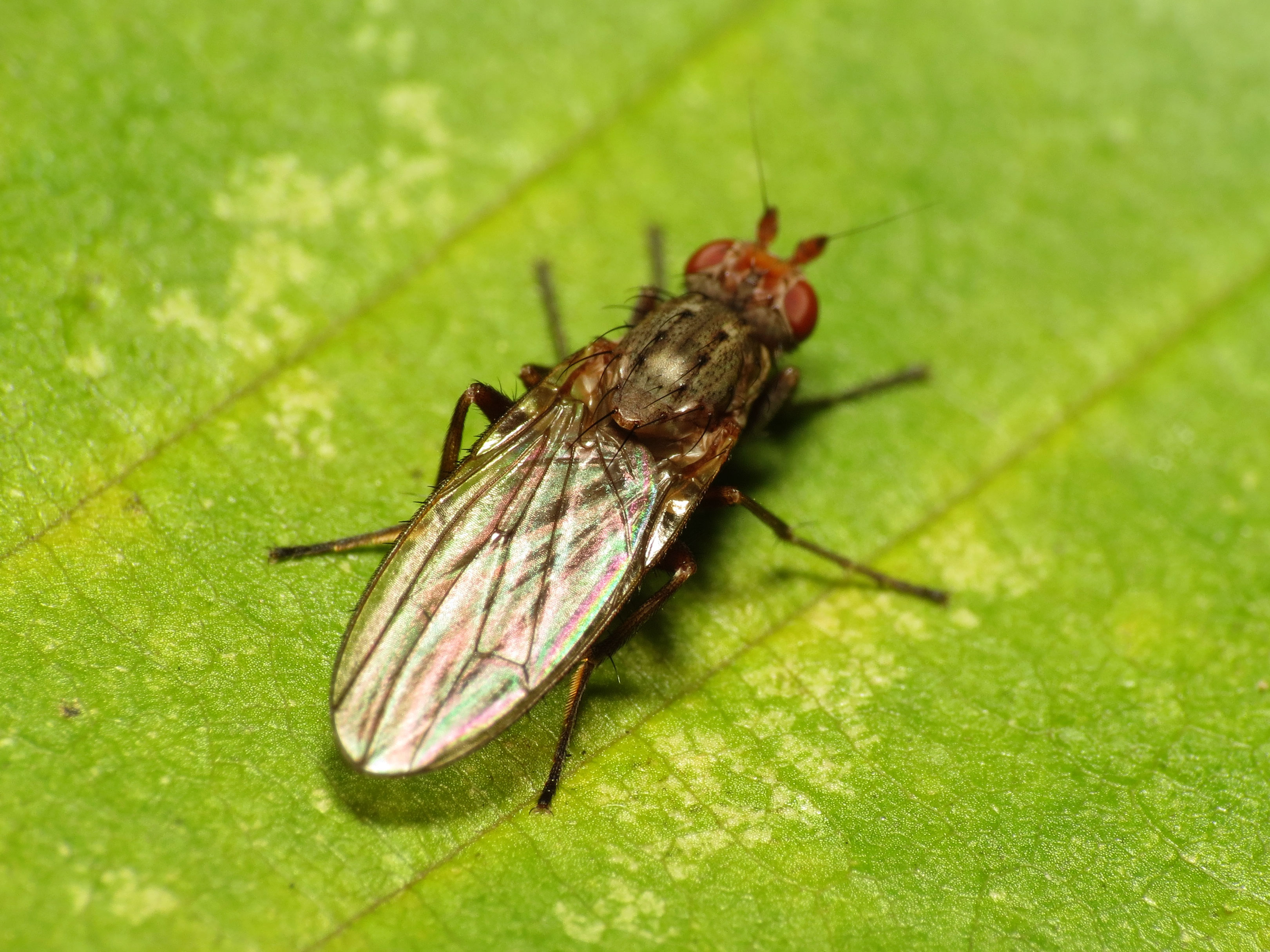
Scoliocentra

== Genera ==
These 10 genera belong to the tribe Heleomyzini:

- Acantholeria Garrett, 1921
- Amoebaleria Garrett, 1921
- Anorostoma Loew, 1862
- Heleomyza Fallén, 1810
- Lutomyia Aldrich, 1922
- Morpholeria C.B.Garrett, 1921
- Neoleria Malloch, 1919
- Pseudoleria Garrett, 1921
- Schroederella Enderlein, 1920
- Scoliocentra Loew, 1862
